= Chicken (game) =

Model of conflict for two players in game theory

The game of chicken, also known as the hawk-dove game or snowdrift game, is a model of conflict for two players in game theory. The principle of the game is that while the ideal outcome is for one player to yield (to avoid the worst outcome if neither yields), individuals try to avoid it out of pride, not wanting to look like "chickens". The players may taunt each other to increase the shame of yielding. When one player yields the conflict is avoided and the game ends.

The name "chicken" has its origins in a game in which two drivers drive toward each other on a collision course: one must swerve, or both may die in the crash, but if one driver swerves and the other does not, the one who swerved will be called a "chicken", meaning a coward; this terminology is most prevalent in political science and economics. The name "hawk–dove" refers to a situation in which there is a competition for a shared resource and the contestants can choose either conciliation or conflict; this terminology is most commonly used in biology and evolutionary game theory. From a game-theoretic point of view, "chicken" and "hawk–dove" are identical. The game has also been used to describe the mutual assured destruction of nuclear warfare, especially the sort of brinkmanship involved in the Cuban Missile Crisis.

== Popular versions ==
The game of chicken models two drivers, both headed for a single-lane bridge from opposite directions. The first to swerve away yields the bridge to the other. If neither player swerves, the result is a costly deadlock in the middle of the bridge or a potentially fatal head-on collision. It is presumed that the best thing for each driver is to stay straight while the other swerves (since the other is the "chicken" while a crash is avoided). Additionally, a crash is presumed to be the worst outcome for both players. This yields a situation where each player, in attempting to secure their best outcome, risks the worst.

The phrase game of chicken is also used as a metaphor for a situation where two parties engage in a showdown where they have nothing to gain and only pride stops them from backing down. Bertrand Russell famously compared the game of Chicken to nuclear brinkmanship:

Since the nuclear stalemate became apparent, the governments of East and West have adopted the policy that Mr. Dulles calls 'brinkmanship'. This is a policy adapted from a sport that, I am told, is practiced by some youthful degenerates. This sport is called 'Chicken!'. It is played by choosing a long, straight road with a white line down the middle and starting two very fast cars toward each other from opposite ends. Each car is expected to keep the wheels on one side of the white line. As they approach each other, mutual destruction becomes more and more imminent. If one of them swerves from the white line before the other, the other, as they pass, shouts 'Chicken!', and the one who has swerved becomes an object of contempt. As played by irresponsible boys, this game is considered decadent and immoral, though only the lives of the players are risked. But when the game is played by eminent statesmen, who risk not only their own lives but those of many hundreds of millions of human beings, it is thought on both sides that the statesmen on one side are displaying a high degree of wisdom and courage, and only the statesmen on the other side are reprehensible. Of course, this is absurd. Both are to blame for playing such an incredibly dangerous game. The game may be played without misfortune a few times, but sooner or later, it will come to be felt that loss of face is more dreadful than nuclear annihilation. The moment will come when neither side can face the derisive cry of 'Chicken!' from the other side. When that moment comes, the statesmen of both sides will plunge the world into destruction.

Brinkmanship involves the introduction of an element of uncontrollable risk: even if all players act rationally in the face of risk, uncontrollable events can still trigger the catastrophic outcome. In the "chickie run" scene from the film Rebel Without a Cause, this happens when Buzz cannot escape from the car and dies in the crash. The opposite scenario occurs in the film Footloose where Ren McCormack is stuck in his tractor and hence wins the game as they cannot play "chicken". A similar event happens in two different games in the film The Heavenly Kid, when first Bobby, and then later Lenny become stuck in their cars and drive off a cliff. The basic game-theoretic formulation of Chicken has no element of variable, potentially catastrophic, risk, and is also the contraction of a dynamic situation into a one-shot interaction.

The hawk–dove version of the game imagines two players (animals) contesting an indivisible resource who can choose between two strategies, one more escalated than the other. They can use threat displays (play Dove), or physically attack each other (play Hawk). If both players choose the Hawk strategy, then they fight until one is injured and the other wins. If only one player chooses Hawk, then this player defeats the Dove player. If both players play Dove, there is a tie, and each player receives a payoff lower than the profit of a hawk defeating a dove.

== Game theoretic applications ==
=== Chicken ===
	Swerve	Straight
Swerve	Tie, Tie	Lose, Win
Straight	Win, Lose	Crash, Crash
Fig. 1: A payoff matrix of Chicken

	Swerve	Straight
Swerve	0, 0	-1, +1
Straight	+1, -1	-1000, -1000
Fig. 2: Chicken with numerical payoffs

A formal version of the game of Chicken has been the subject of serious research in game theory. Two versions of the payoff matrix for this game are presented here (Figures 1 and 2). In Figure 1, the outcomes are represented in words, where each player would prefer to win over tying, prefer to tie over losing, and prefer to lose over crashing. Figure 2 presents arbitrarily set numerical payoffs which theoretically conform to this situation. Here, the benefit of winning is 1, the cost of losing is -1, and the cost of crashing is -1000.

Both Chicken and Hawk–Dove are anti-coordination games, in which it is mutually beneficial for the players to play different strategies. In this way, it can be thought of as the opposite of a coordination game, where playing the same strategy Pareto dominates playing different strategies. The underlying concept is that players use a shared resource. In coordination games, sharing the resource creates a benefit for all: the resource is non-rivalrous, and the shared usage creates positive externalities. In anti-coordination games the resource is rivalrous but non-excludable and sharing comes at a cost (or negative externality).

Because the loss of swerving is so trivial compared to the crash that occurs if nobody swerves, the reasonable strategy would seem to be to swerve before a crash is likely. Yet, knowing this, if one believes one's opponent to be reasonable, one may well decide not to swerve at all, in the belief that the opponent will be reasonable and decide to swerve, leaving the first player the winner. This unstable situation can be formalized by saying there is more than one Nash equilibrium, which is a pair of strategies for which neither player gains by changing their own strategy while the other stays the same. (In this case, the pure strategy equilibria are the two situations wherein one player swerves while the other does not.)

=== Hawk–dove ===
	Hawk	Dove
Hawk	(V−C)/2, (V−C)/2	V, 0
Dove	0, V	V/2, V/2
Fig. 3: Hawk–Dove game

	Hawk	Dove
Hawk	X, X	W, L
Dove	L, W	T, T
Fig. 4: General Hawk–Dove game

In the biological literature, this game is known as Hawk–Dove. The earliest presentation of a form of the Hawk–Dove game was by John Maynard Smith and George Price in their paper, "The logic of animal conflict". The traditional payoff matrix for the Hawk–Dove game is given in Figure 3, where V is the value of the contested resource, and C is the cost of an escalated fight. It is (almost always) assumed that the value of the resource is less than the cost of a fight, i.e., C > V > 0. If C ≤ V, the resulting game is not a game of Chicken but is instead a Prisoner's Dilemma.

Hawk–Dove transforming into Prisoner's Dilemma. As C becomes smaller than V, the mixed strategy equilibrium moves to the pure strategy equilibrium of both players playing hawk

The exact value of the Dove vs. Dove payoff varies between model formulations. Sometimes the players are assumed to split the payoff equally (V/2 each), other times the payoff is assumed to be zero (since this is the expected payoff to a war of attrition game, which is the presumed models for a contest decided by display duration).

While the Hawk–Dove game is typically taught and discussed with the payoffs in terms of V and C, the solutions hold true for any matrix with the payoffs in Figure 4, where W > T > L > X.

==== Hawk–dove variants ====
Biologists have explored modified versions of classic Hawk–Dove game to investigate a number of biologically relevant factors. These include adding variation in resource holding potential, and differences in the value of winning to the different players, allowing the players to threaten each other before choosing moves in the game, and extending the interaction to two plays of the game.

==== Pre-commitment ====
One tactic in the game is for one party to signal their intentions convincingly before the game begins. For example, if one party were to ostentatiously disable their steering wheel just before the match, the other party would be compelled to swerve. This shows that, in some circumstances, reducing one's own options can be a good strategy. One real-world example is a protester who handcuffs themselves to an object, so that no threat can be made which would compel them to move (since they cannot move). Another example, taken from fiction, is found in Stanley Kubrick's Dr. Strangelove. In that film, the Russians sought to deter American attack by building a "doomsday machine", a device that would trigger world annihilation if Russia was hit by nuclear weapons or if any attempt were made to disarm it. However, the Russians had planned to signal the deployment of the machine a few days after having set it up, which, because of an unfortunate course of events, turned out to be too late.

Players may also make non-binding threats to not swerve. This has been modeled explicitly in the Hawk–Dove game. Such threats work, but must be wastefully costly if the threat is one of two possible signals ("I will not swerve" or "I will swerve"), or they will be costless if there are three or more signals (in which case the signals will function as a game of "rock, paper, scissors").

This strategy can also be seen successfully used in a viral video, in which a contestant of Golden Balls (in a game also known as split or steal) persisted that he will steal, causing the other to split. In the video, both contestants choose split. This forced the action of the other, leading to the best outcome for both in this case, as if both chose steal then both contestants would have been left with nothing.

== Best response mapping and Nash equilibria ==
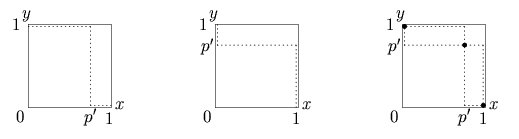
Fig.5 - Reaction correspondences for both players in a discoordination game. Compare with replicator dynamic vector fields below

All anti-coordination games have three Nash equilibria. Two of these are pure contingent strategy profiles, in which each player plays one of the pair of strategies, and the other player chooses the opposite strategy. The third one is a mixed equilibrium, in which each player probabilistically chooses between the two pure strategies. Either the pure, or mixed, Nash equilibria will be evolutionarily stable strategies depending upon whether uncorrelated asymmetries exist.

The best response mapping for all 2x2 anti-coordination games is shown in Figure 5. The variables x and y in Figure 5 are the probabilities of playing the escalated strategy ("Hawk" or "Don't swerve") for players X and Y respectively. The line in graph on the left shows the optimum probability of playing the escalated strategy for player Y as a function of x. The line in the second graph shows the optimum probability of playing the escalated strategy for player X as a function of y (the axes have not been rotated, so the dependent variable is plotted on the abscissa, and the independent variable is plotted on the ordinate). The Nash equilibria are where the players' correspondences agree, i.e., cross. These are shown with points in the right hand graph. The best response mappings agree (i.e., cross) at three points. The first two Nash equilibria are in the top left and bottom right corners, where one player chooses one strategy, the other player chooses the opposite strategy. The third Nash equilibrium is a mixed strategy which lies along the diagonal from the bottom left to top right corners. If the players do not know which one of them is which, then the mixed Nash is an evolutionarily stable strategy (ESS), as play is confined to the bottom left to top right diagonal line. Otherwise an uncorrelated asymmetry is said to exist, and the corner Nash equilibria are ESSes.

=== Strategy polymorphism vis-à-vis strategy mixing ===
The ESS for the Hawk–Dove game is a mixed strategy. Formal game theory is indifferent to whether this mixture is due to all players in a population choosing randomly between the two pure strategies (a range of possible instinctive reactions for a single situation) or whether the population is a polymorphic mixture of players dedicated to choosing a particular pure strategy(a single reaction differing from individual to individual). Biologically, these two options are strikingly different ideas. The Hawk–Dove game has been used as a basis for evolutionary simulations to explore which of these two modes of mixing ought to predominate in reality.

== Symmetry breaking ==
In both "Chicken" and "Hawk–Dove", the only symmetric Nash equilibrium is the mixed strategy Nash equilibrium, where both individuals randomly chose between playing Hawk/Straight or Dove/Swerve. This mixed strategy equilibrium is often sub-optimal—both players would do better if they could coordinate their actions in some way. This observation has been made independently in two different contexts, with almost identical results.

=== Correlated equilibrium and the game of chicken ===
	Dare	Chicken
Dare	0,0	7,2
Chicken	2,7	6,6
Fig. 6: A version of Chicken

Consider the version of "Chicken" pictured in Figure 6. Like all forms of the game, there are three Nash equilibria. The two pure strategy Nash equilibria are (D, C) and (C, D). There is also a mixed strategy equilibrium where each player Dares with probability 1/3. It results in expected payoffs of 14/3 = 4.667 for each player.

Now consider a third party (or some natural event) that draws one of three cards labeled: (C, C), (D, C), and (C, D). This exogenous draw event is assumed to be uniformly at random over the three outcomes. After drawing the card the third party informs the players of the strategy assigned to them on the card (but not the strategy assigned to their opponent). Suppose a player is assigned D, they would not want to deviate supposing the other player played their assigned strategy since they will get 7 (the highest payoff possible). Suppose a player is assigned C. Then the other player has been assigned C with probability 1/2 and D with probability 1/2 (due to the nature of the exogenous draw). The expected utility of Daring is 0(1/2) + 7(1/2) = 3.5 and the expected utility of chickening out is 2(1/2) + 6(1/2) = 4. So, the player would prefer to chicken out.

Since neither player has an incentive to deviate from the drawn assignments, this probability distribution over the strategies is known as a correlated equilibrium of the game. Notably, the expected payoff for this equilibrium is 7(1/3) + 2(1/3) + 6(1/3) = 5 which is higher than the expected payoff of the mixed strategy Nash equilibrium.

=== Uncorrelated asymmetries and solutions to the hawk–dove game ===
Although there are three Nash equilibria in the Hawk–Dove game, the one which emerges as the evolutionarily stable strategy (ESS) depends upon the existence of any uncorrelated asymmetry in the game (in the sense of anti-coordination games). In order for row players to choose one strategy and column players the other, the players must be able to distinguish which role (column or row player) they have. If no such uncorrelated asymmetry exists then both players must choose the same strategy, and the ESS will be the mixing Nash equilibrium. If there is an uncorrelated asymmetry, then the mixing Nash is not an ESS, but the two pure, role contingent, Nash equilibria are.

The standard biological interpretation of this uncorrelated asymmetry is that one player is the territory owner, while the other is an intruder on the territory. In most cases, the territory owner plays Hawk while the intruder plays Dove. In this sense, the evolution of strategies in Hawk–Dove can be seen as the evolution of a sort of prototypical version of ownership. However, game-theoretically, there is nothing special about this solution. The opposite solution—where the owner plays dove and the intruder plays Hawk—is equally stable. In fact, this solution is present in a certain species of spider; when an invader appears the occupying spider leaves. In order to explain the prevalence of property rights over "anti-property rights" one must discover a way to break this additional symmetry.

== Replicator dynamics ==
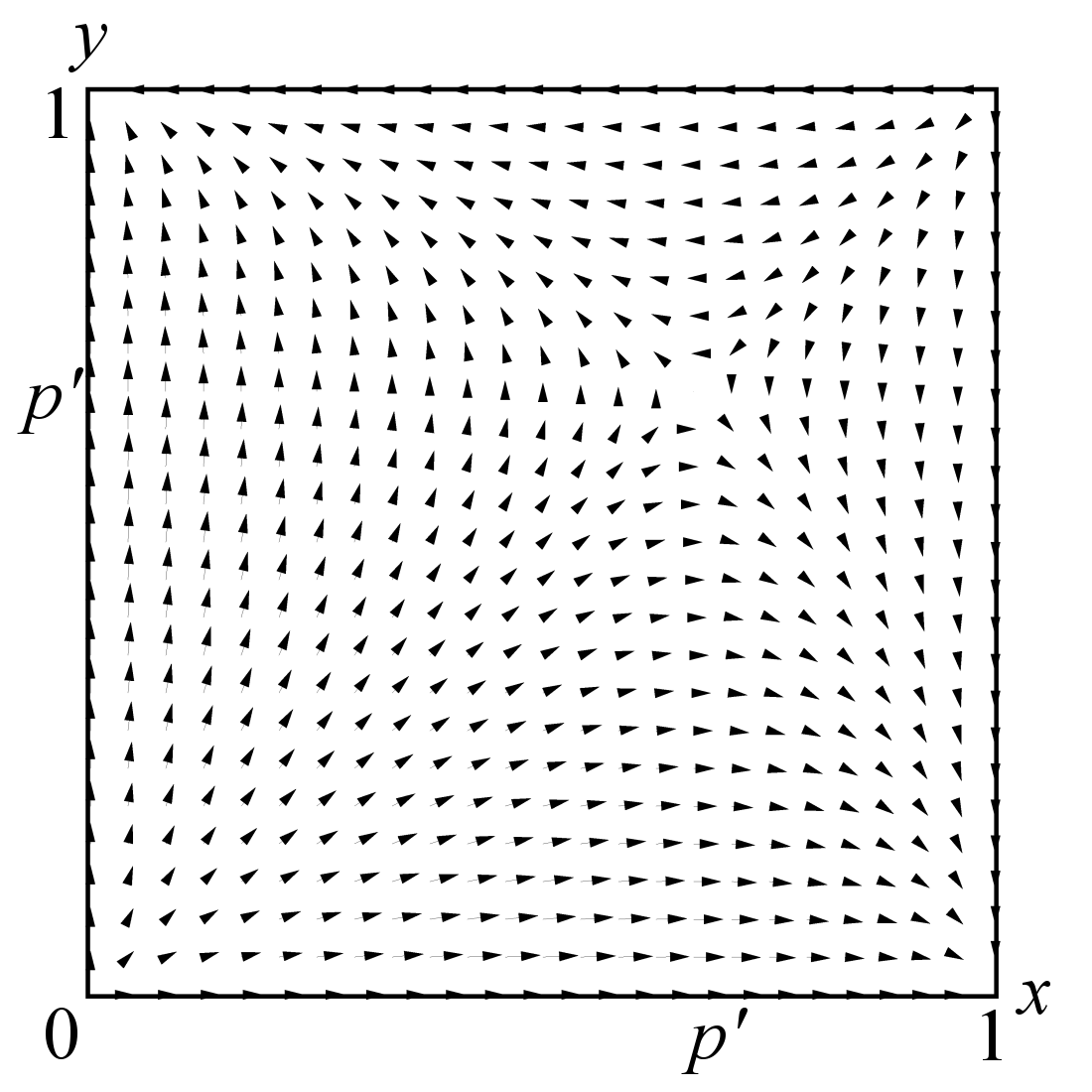
Fig 7a: Vector field for two population replicator dynamics and Hawk–Dove

Replicator dynamics is a simple model of strategy change commonly used in evolutionary game theory. In this model, a strategy which does better than the average increases in frequency at the expense of strategies that do worse than the average. There are two versions of the replicator dynamics. In one version, there is a single population which plays against itself. In another, there are two population models where each population only plays against the other population (and not against itself).

In the one population model, the only stable state is the mixed strategy Nash equilibrium. Every initial population proportion (except all Hawk and all Dove) converge to the mixed strategy Nash Equilibrium where part of the population plays Hawk and part of the population plays Dove. (This occurs because the only ESS is the mixed strategy equilibrium.) In the two population model, this mixed point becomes unstable. In fact, the only stable states in the two population model correspond to the pure strategy equilibria, where one population is composed of all Hawks and the other of all Doves. In this model one population becomes the aggressive population while the other becomes passive. This model is illustrated by the vector field pictured in Figure 7a. The one-dimensional vector field of the single population model (Figure 7b) corresponds to the bottom left to top right diagonal of the two population model.

Fig. 7b: Vector field for single population replicator dynamics

The single population model presents a situation where no uncorrelated asymmetries exist, and so the best players can do is randomize their strategies. The two population models provide such an asymmetry and the members of each population will then use that to correlate their strategies. In the two population model, one population gains at the expense of another. Hawk–Dove and Chicken thus illustrate an interesting case where the qualitative results for the two different versions of the replicator dynamics differ wildly.

== Related strategies and games ==
=== Brinkmanship ===
"Chicken" and "Brinkmanship" are often used synonymously in the context of conflict, but in the strict game-theoretic sense, "brinkmanship" refers to a strategic move designed to avert the possibility of the opponent switching to aggressive behavior. The move involves a credible threat of the risk of irrational behavior in the face of aggression. If player 1 unilaterally moves to A, a rational player 2 cannot retaliate since (A, C) is preferable to (A, A). Only if player 1 has grounds to believe that there is sufficient risk that player 2 responds irrationally (usually by giving up control over the response, so that there is sufficient risk that player 2 responds with A) player 1 will retract and agree on the compromise.

=== War of attrition ===
Like "Chicken", the "War of attrition" game models escalation of conflict, but they differ in the form in which the conflict can escalate. Chicken models a situation in which the catastrophic outcome differs in kind from the agreeable outcome, e.g., if the conflict is over life and death. War of attrition models a situation in which the outcomes differ only in degrees, such as a boxing match in which the contestants have to decide whether the ultimate prize of victory is worth the ongoing cost of deteriorating health and stamina.

=== Hawk–dove and war of attrition ===
The Hawk–Dove game is the most commonly used game theoretical model of aggressive interactions in biology. The war of attrition is another very influential model of aggression in biology. The two models investigate slightly different questions. The Hawk–Dove game is a model of escalation, and addresses the question of when ought an individual escalate to dangerously costly physical combat. The war of attrition seeks to answer the question of how contests may be resolved when there is no possibility of physical combat. The war of attrition is an auction in which both players pay the lower bid (an all-pay second price auction). The bids are assumed to be the duration which the player is willing to persist in making a costly threat display. Both players accrue costs while displaying at each other, the contest ends when the individual making the lower bid quits. Both players will then have paid the lower bid.

=== Chicken and prisoner's dilemma ===
Chicken is a symmetrical 2x2 game with conflicting interests, the preferred outcome is to play Straight while the opponent plays Swerve. Similarly, the prisoner's dilemma is a symmetrical 2x2 game with conflicting interests: the preferred outcome is to Defect while the opponent plays Cooperate. PD is about the impossibility of cooperation while Chicken is about the inevitability of conflict. Iterated play in PD can lead to symmetric cooperation, whereas iteration in Chicken can lead to turn-taking.

	Defect	Cooperate
Defect	N	T
Cooperate	P	C
Prisoner's dilemma. Payoff ranks (to Row player) are: Temptation > Coordination > Neutral > Punishment.

Both games have a desirable cooperative outcome in which both players choose the less escalated strategy, Swerve-Swerve in the Chicken game, and Cooperate-Cooperate in the prisoner's dilemma, such that players receive the Coordination payoff C (see tables below). The temptation away from this sensible outcome is toward a Straight move in Chicken and a Defect move in the prisoner's dilemma (generating the Temptation payoff, should the other player use the less escalated move). The essential difference between these two games is that in the prisoner's dilemma, the Cooperate strategy is dominated, whereas in Chicken the equivalent move is not dominated since the outcome payoffs when the opponent plays the more escalated move (Straight in place of Defect) are reversed.

	Straight	Swerve
Straight	P	T
Swerve	N	C
Chicken/Hawk–Dove. Payoff ranks (to Row player) are: Temptation > Coordination > Neutral > Punishment.

=== Many-player versions ===
Much as the Public goods game reduces to a Prisoner's dilemma when the number of players is two, so do certain other many-player games reduce to Chicken.

As one example, the Volunteer's dilemma is a game in which each player must choose between two options: to volunteer or not. A player’s best outcome results when they do not volunteer, but at least one other player does; the worst outcome results when no player volunteers. As the number of players increases, it becomes more likely that none will volunteer (see Diffusion of responsibility). In the El Farol Bar problem, the choice is to go to the bar or stay home, and which choice yields a better outcome depends upon what portion of other players choose to go (this would reduce to the volunteer's dilemma if the portion threshold were zero).

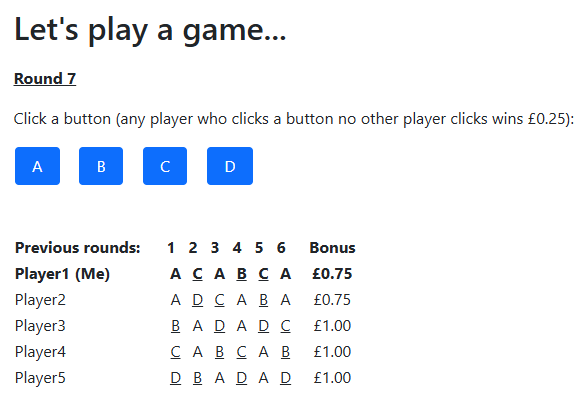
Screenshot of MAD Chairs game software at https://github.com/ChrisSantosLang/MADChairs

As other examples, the "Lifeboat Problem" and Kolkata Paise Restaurant Problem are games in which each player can choose between many resources which have limited capacity to be divided (as with the passenger limit of a boat). A player’s best outcome results when the number of other players who select the same resource is within its capacity. It is typically stipulated that the players outnumber the total capacity, such that not all players can attain the best outcome. In realistic situations, players also have an option to select no resource, and such a game reduces to Chicken when the number of players is two.

In experiments with the iterated Lifeboat Problem (a.k.a. “MAD Chairs”), caste systems evolve. However, it would be smarter to reform our caste systems than to seek a top position within them because the strategy with greatest theoretical and empirical support is turn-taking (specifically which tracks favors owed and reserves resources for the least indebted players). The computational intensity of tracking debt across diverse situations raises the possibility that we may be unable to avoid caste behavior without help from computers.

== Schedule chicken and project management ==
The term "schedule chicken" is used in project management and software development circles. The condition occurs when two or more areas of a product team claim they can deliver features at an unrealistically early date because each assumes the other teams are stretching the predictions even more than they are. This pretense continually moves forward past one project checkpoint to the next until feature integration begins or just before the functionality is actually due.

The practice of "schedule chicken" often results in contagious schedule slips due to the inter-team dependencies and is difficult to identify and resolve, as it is in the best interest of each team not to be the first bearer of bad news. The psychological drivers underlining the "schedule chicken" behavior in many ways mimic the hawk–dove or snowdrift model of conflict.

== See also ==
- Brinkmanship
- Coordination game
- Fireship, a naval tactic of intentional suicidal ramming into an enemy ship
- Matching pennies
- Mexican standoff
- Prisoner's dilemma
- Ritualized aggression
- Si vis pacem, para bellum
- Volunteer's dilemma
- War of attrition
- Zugzwang
- Kolkata Paise Restaurant Problem
