= Uncorrelated asymmetry =

In game theory, an uncorrelated asymmetry is an arbitrary distinguishing feature between players in an otherwise symmetric game. This concept refers to asymmetries that are unrelated to the payoffs or strategic structure of the game itself, but instead arise from players' ability to distinguish their roles or identities within the game. It is opposed to correlated asymmetries, where the asymmetry directly affects payoffs or strategic considerations. The term was introduced by John Maynard Smith in 1973.

For example, consider two drivers approaching each other on a narrow road where only one can pass at a time. The payoffs are symmetric—both prefer that one yields while the other proceeds rather than both attempting to proceed simultaneously. However, if one driver arrived first or is driving on the correct side according to local convention, this creates an uncorrelated asymmetry that can guide their strategies without changing the underlying payoff structure.

The key feature of an uncorrelated asymmetry lies in players' knowledge of their assigned roles. In a symmetric game, if players know whether they are Player 1, Player 2, or more generally whether they are the row player versus column player in a bimatrix game, then an uncorrelated asymmetry exists. Conversely, if players cannot distinguish their roles, no uncorrelated asymmetry is present.

This creates what is sometimes called an information asymmetry, though this terminology can be misleading. Games with uncorrelated asymmetries remain games of complete information in the technical sense—all players know the full game structure and payoffs. The asymmetry refers specifically to each player's knowledge of their own role: one player knows they are Player 1 while the other knows they are Player 2. This differs from information sets in extensive form games, which concern knowledge about the history of play or opponents' private information.

== Applications ==
Uncorrelated asymmetries play a crucial role in determining which Nash equilibria qualify as evolutionarily stable strategies (ESS) in coordination games and discoordination games. In games like the game of chicken or battle of the sexes:

- Without uncorrelated asymmetry: the mixed strategy Nash equilibrium typically serves as the ESS
- With uncorrelated asymmetry: pure strategy conditional equilibria become evolutionarily stable, where each player's strategy depends on their assigned role

The most widely cited example of uncorrelated asymmetry is territory ownership in the hawk-dove game. Even when both players (the "owner" and "intruder") face identical payoffs, making the game payoff-symmetric, their roles create an uncorrelated asymmetry. This enables stable strategies such as:

- Bourgeois strategy: The territory owner plays Hawk (aggressive), while the intruder plays Dove (submissive)
- Anti-bourgeois strategy: The reverse pattern, though this is considered less biologically plausible

Other examples include conventions based on arbitrary physical or social markers, such as age, size, or arrival time, which can serve as coordination devices without affecting the underlying strategic incentives.

In evolutionary game theory, uncorrelated asymmetries help explain how populations can maintain stable behavioral patterns in otherwise symmetric interactions. They provide a mechanism for coordination that doesn't require communication or repeated interaction, making them particularly relevant for understanding animal behavior and the evolution of conventions in human societies.

== See also ==
- The section on uncorrelated asymmetries in Game of chicken
- The section on discoordination games in Best response.
