= Stable equilibrium =

Stable equilibrium can refer to:

- Homeostasis, a state of equilibrium used to describe organisms
- Mechanical equilibrium, a state in which all particles in a system are at rest, and total force on each particle is permanently zero
- Balance of nature, a theory in ecological science
- Stability theory, a theory in mathematics
- Mertens-stable equilibrium in game theory
- Stochastically stable equilibrium in game theory
