= Max-dominated strategy =

Mathematical criterion in game theory

In game theory, a max-dominated strategy is a strategy that is never a best response to any possible strategy profile of the other players. This means there is no situation in which the strategy is optimal to play, even if it is not strictly worse than another strategy in every case.

The concept generalizes the notion of a strictly dominated strategy, which is a strategy that always yields a lower payoff than some other strategy, no matter what the other players do. Every strictly dominated strategy is max-dominated, but not every max-dominated strategy is strictly dominated. For example, suppose strategy A gives the same payoff as another strategy B against some opponent choices, but never gives a higher payoff than B—and is strictly worse in some cases. In this case, A is never a best response, so it is max-dominated, even though it is not strictly dominated.

== Definition ==
=== Max-dominated strategies ===
A strategy $s_i\in S_i$ of player $i$ is max-dominated if for every strategy profile of the other players $s_{-i}\in S_{-i}$ there is a strategy $s^\prime_i\in S_i$ such that $u_i(s^\prime_i,s_{-i})> u_i(s_i,s_{-i})$. This definition means that $s_i$ is not a best response to any strategy profile $s_{-i}$, since for every such strategy profile there is another strategy $s^\prime_i$ which gives higher utility than $s_i$ for player $i$.

If a strategy $s_i\in S_i$ is strictly dominated by strategy $s^\prime_i \in S_i$ then it is also max-dominated, since for every strategy profile of the other players $s_{-i}\in S_{-i}$, $s^\prime_i$ is the strategy for which $u_i(s^\prime_i,s_{-i})> u_i(s_i,s_{-i})$.

Even if $s_i$ is strictly dominated by a mixed strategy it is also max-dominated.

=== Weakly max-dominated strategies ===
A strategy $s_i\in S_i$ of player $i$ is weakly max-dominated if for every strategy profile of the other players $s_{-i}\in S_{-i}$ there is a strategy $s^\prime_i\in S_i$ such that $u_i(s^\prime_i,s_{-i}) \geq u_i(s_i,s_{-i})$. This definition means that $s_i$ is either not a best response or not the only best response to any strategy profile $s_{-i}$, since for every such strategy profile there is another strategy $s^\prime_i$ which gives at least the same utility as $s_i$ for player $i$.

If a strategy $s_i\in S_i$ is weakly dominated by strategy $s^\prime_i \in S_i$ then it is also weakly max-dominated, since for every strategy profile of the other players $s_{-i}\in S_{-i}$, $s^\prime_i$ is the strategy for which $u_i(s^\prime_i,s_{-i})\geq u_i(s_i,s_{-i})$.

Even if $s_i$ is weakly dominated by a mixed strategy it is also weakly max-dominated.

== Max-solvable games ==
=== Definition ===
A game $G$ is said to be max-solvable if by iterated elimination of max-dominated strategies only one strategy profile is left at the end.

More formally we say that $G$ is max-solvable if there exists a sequence of games $G_0, ..., G_r$ such that:

- $G_0 = G$
- $G_{k+1}$ is obtained by removing a single max-dominated strategy from the strategy space of a single player in $G_k$.
- There is only one strategy profile left in $G_r$.

Obviously every max-solvable game has a unique pure Nash equilibrium which is the strategy profile left in $G_r$.

As in the previous part one can define respectively the notion of weakly max-solvable games, which are games for which a game with a single strategy profile can be reached by eliminating weakly max-dominated strategies. The main difference would be that weakly max-dominated games may have more than one pure Nash equilibrium, and that the order of elimination might result in different Nash equilibria.

=== Example ===
	Cooperate	Defect
Cooperate	-1, -1	-5, 0
Defect	0, -5	-3, -3
Fig. 1: payoff matrix of the prisoner's dilemma

The prisoner's dilemma is an example of a max-solvable game (as it is also dominance solvable). The strategy cooperate is max-dominated by the strategy defect for both players, since playing defect always gives the player a higher utility, no matter what the other player plays. To see this note that if the row player plays cooperate then the column player would prefer playing defect and go free than playing cooperate and serving one year in jail. If the row player plays defect then the column player would prefer playing defect and serve three years in jail rather than playing cooperate and serving five years in jail.

=== Max-solvable games and best-reply dynamics ===
In any max-solvable game, best-reply dynamics ultimately leads to the unique pure Nash equilibrium of the game. In order to see this, all we need to do is notice that if $s_1, s_2, s_3, ..., s_k$ is an elimination sequence of the game (meaning that first $s_1$ is eliminated from the strategy space of some player since it is max-dominated, then $s_2$ is eliminated, and so on), then in the best-response dynamics $s_1$ will be never played by its player after one iteration of best responses, $s_2$ will never be played by its player after two iterations of best responses and so on. The reason for this is that $s_1$ is not a best response to any strategy profile of the other players $s_{-i}$ so after one iteration of best responses its player must have chosen a different strategy. Since we understand that we will never return to $s_1$ in any iteration of the best responses, we can treat the game after one iteration of best responses as if $s_1$ has been eliminated from the game, and complete the proof by induction.

A weakly max-solvable game
1, 1	0, 0
1, 0	0, 1
0, 1	1, 0

It may come by surprise then that weakly max-solvable games do not necessarily converge to a pure Nash equilibrium when using the best-reply dynamics, as can be seen in the game on the right. If the game starts of the bottom left cell of the matrix, then the following best replay dynamics is possible: the row player moves one row up to the center row, the column player moves to the right column, the row player moves back to the bottom row, the column player moves back to the left column and so on. This obviously never converges to the unique pure Nash equilibrium of the game (which is the upper left cell in the payoff matrix).

== See also ==
- Dominance (game theory)

== External links and references ==
- Nisan, Noam; Schapira, Michael; Zohar, Aviv (2009), Asynchronous best reply dynamics, Berlin: Springer-Verlag, archived from the original on 2003-04-17. Asynchronous best-reply dynamics. .
