= Strategic dominance =

Quality of a strategy in game theory

Dominant strategy
- Solution concept in game theory

Relationship
- Subset of: Strategy (game theory)
- Superset of: Rationalizable strategy

Significance
- Used for: Prisoner's dilemma

In game theory, a strategy A dominates another strategy B if A will always produce a better result than B, regardless of how any other player plays. Some very simple games (called straightforward games) can be solved using dominance.

A strategy that is not dominated by another strategy is called admissible. A common assumption in game theory is that rational players use admissible strategies.

== Terminology ==
A player can compare two strategies, A and B, to determine which one is better. The result of the comparison is one of:

- B strictly dominates (>) A: choosing B always gives a better outcome than choosing A, no matter what the other players do.
- B weakly dominates (≥) A: choosing B always gives at least as good an outcome as choosing A, no matter what the other players do, and there is at least one set of opponents' actions for which B gives a better outcome than A. (Notice that if B strictly dominates A, then B weakly dominates A. Therefore, we can say "B dominates A" to mean "B weakly dominates A".)
- B is weakly dominated by A: there is at least one set of opponents' actions for which B gives a worse outcome than A, while all other sets of opponents' actions give B the same payoff as A. (Strategy A weakly dominates B).
- B is strictly dominated by A: choosing B always gives a worse outcome than choosing A, no matter what the other player(s) do. (Strategy A strictly dominates B).
- Neither A nor B dominates the other: B and A are not equivalent, and B neither dominates, nor is dominated by, A. Choosing A is better in some cases, while choosing B is better in other cases, depending on exactly how the opponent chooses to play. For example, B is "throw rock" while A is "throw scissors" in Rock, Paper, Scissors.

This notion can be generalized beyond the comparison of two strategies.

- Strategy B is strictly dominant if strategy B strictly dominates every other possible strategy.
- Strategy B is weakly dominant if strategy B weakly dominates every other possible strategy.
- Strategy B is strictly dominated if some other strategy exists that strictly dominates B.
- Strategy B is weakly dominated if some other strategy exists that weakly dominates B.

Strategy: A complete contingent plan for a player in the game. A complete contingent plan is a full specification of a player's behavior, describing each action a player would take at every possible decision point. Because information sets represent points in a game where a player must make a decision, a player's strategy describes what that player will do at each information set.

Rationality: The assumption that each player acts in a way that is designed to bring about what he or she most prefers given probabilities of various outcomes; von Neumann and Morgenstern showed that if these preferences satisfy certain conditions, this is mathematically equivalent to maximizing a payoff. A straightforward example of maximizing payoff is that of monetary gain, but for the purpose of a game theory analysis, this payoff can take any desired outcome—cash reward, minimization of exertion or discomfort, or promoting justice can all be modeled as amassing an overall “utility” for the player. The assumption of rationality states that players will always act in the way that best satisfies their ordering from best to worst of various possible outcomes.

Common Knowledge: The assumption that each player has knowledge of the game, knows the rules and payoffs associated with each course of action, and realizes that every other player has this same level of understanding. This is the premise that allows a player to make a value judgment on the actions of another player, backed by the assumption of rationality, into consideration when selecting an action.

== Dominance and Nash equilibria ==
	C	D
C	1, 1	0, 0
D	0, 0	0, 0

If a strictly dominant strategy exists for one player in a game, that player will play that strategy in each of the game's Nash equilibria. If both players have a strictly dominant strategy, the game has only one unique Nash equilibrium, referred to as a "dominant strategy equilibrium". However, that Nash equilibrium is not necessarily "efficient", meaning that there may be non-equilibrium outcomes of the game that would be better for both players. The classic game used to illustrate this is the Prisoner's Dilemma.

Strictly dominated strategies cannot be a part of a Nash equilibrium, and as such, it is irrational for any player to play them. On the other hand, weakly dominated strategies may be part of Nash equilibria. For instance, consider the payoff matrix pictured at the right.

Strategy C weakly dominates strategy D. Consider playing C: If one's opponent plays C, one gets 1; if one's opponent plays D, one gets 0. Compare this to D, where one gets 0 regardless. Since in one case, one does better by playing C instead of D and never does worse, C weakly dominates D. Despite this, $(D, D)$ is a Nash equilibrium. Suppose both players choose D. Neither player will do any better by unilaterally deviating—if a player switches to playing C, they will still get 0. This satisfies the requirements of a Nash equilibrium. Suppose both players choose C. Neither player will do better by unilaterally deviating—if a player switches to playing D, they will get 0. This also satisfies the requirements of a Nash equilibrium.

== Iterated elimination of strictly dominated strategies ==
The iterated elimination (or deletion, or removal) of dominated strategies (also denominated as IESDS, or IDSDS, or IRSDS) is one common technique for solving games that involves iteratively removing dominated strategies. In the first step, all dominated strategies are removed from the strategy space of each of the players, since no rational player would ever play these strategies. This results in a new, smaller game. Some strategies—that were not dominated before—may be dominated in the smaller game. The first step is repeated, creating a new even smaller game, and so on.

This process is valid since it is assumed that rationality among players is common knowledge, that is, each player knows that the rest of the players are rational, and each player knows that the rest of the players know that he knows that the rest of the players are rational, and so on ad infinitum (see Aumann, 1976).

== Iterated elimination of weakly dominated strategies ==
Iterated elimination (or deletion, or removal) of weakly dominated strategies (also denominated as IEWDS, or IDWDS, or IRWDS) is a procedure in strategic-form games in which one iteratively removes from each player’s strategy set any strategy that is weakly dominated (i.e., never yields a higher payoff and sometimes yields a strictly lower payoff than another strategy), treating the reduced game in each round as the basis for further elimination.

While IEWDS generalizes the process of iterated elimination of strictly dominated strategies (IESDS), it differs in several important respects: the result may depend on the order in which weakly dominated strategies are removed (i.e., it is not generally order-independent).

Moreover, although any strategy profile that survives IEWDS must satisfy a certain cautious-rationality condition (players never play weakly dominated strategies given full-support beliefs about opponents), the elimination process can exclude some Nash equilibria of the original game.

Use‐cases of the method include simplification of games in which weak dominance relations exist, and the analysis of games under “cautious belief” assumptions. For instance, recent work shows that in certain well-founded extensive-form games the maximal application of IEWDS can reduce the game to a trivial subgame containing a unique subgame-perfect equilibrium.

== See also ==
- Max-dominated strategy
- Risk dominance
- Winning strategy
