= Schedule chicken =

Project management concept

Schedule chicken is a concept described in project management and software development circles. The condition occurs when two or more parties working towards a common goal all claim to be holding to their original schedules for delivering their part of the work, even after they know those schedules are impossible to meet. Each party hopes the other will be the first to have their failure exposed and thus take all of the blame for the larger project being delayed. This pretense continually moves forward past one project checkpoint to the next, possibly continuing right up until the functionality is actually due.

The practice of schedule chicken often results in contagious schedules slips due to the inter team dependencies and is difficult to identify and resolve, as it is in the best interest of each team not to be the first bearer of bad news. The psychological drivers underlining the "Schedule Chicken" behavior are related to the Hawk-Dove or Snowdrift model of conflict used by players in game theory.

The term derives from the game of chicken played between drivers, as depicted in the movie Rebel Without a Cause, in which two drivers race their hot-rods towards a cliff edge. The first driver to jump out of the car is labeled a "chicken," while the one closest to the edge wins bragging rights.

An early description of the concept and term by Victor Stone was published in MSDN carrying the date April 19, 1999.
