= Stochastically stable equilibrium =

- Solution concept in game theory

Relationship
- Subset of: Evolutionarily stable state

Significance
- Proposed by: Dean Foster, Peyton Young
- Used for: Evolutionary game theory
- Example: Stag hunt

In game theory, a stochastically stable equilibrium is a refinement of the evolutionarily stable state in evolutionary game theory, proposed by Dean Foster and Peyton Young. An evolutionary stable state S is also stochastically stable if under vanishing noise, the probability that the population is in the vicinity of state S does not go to zero.

The concept is extensively used in models of learning in populations, where "noise" is used to model experimentation or replacement of unsuccessful players with new players (random mutation). Over time, as the need for experimentation dies down or the population becomes stable, the population will converge towards a subset of evolutionarily stable states. Foster and Young have shown that this subset is the set of states with the highest potential.
