= Strategic move =

A strategic move in game theory is an action taken by a player outside the defined actions of the game in order to gain a strategic advantage and increase one's payoff. Strategic moves can either be unconditional moves or response rules. The key characteristics of a strategic move are that it involves a commitment from the player, meaning the player can only restrict their own choices and that the commitment has to be credible, meaning that once employed it must be in the interest of the player to follow through with the move. Credible moves should also be observable to the other players.

Strategic moves are not warnings or assurances. Warnings and assurances are merely statements of a player's interest, rather than an actual commitment from the player.

The term was coined by Thomas Schelling in his 1960 book, The Strategy of Conflict, and has gained wide currency in political science and industrial organization.
