= W. Brian Arthur =

American economist

William Brian Arthur
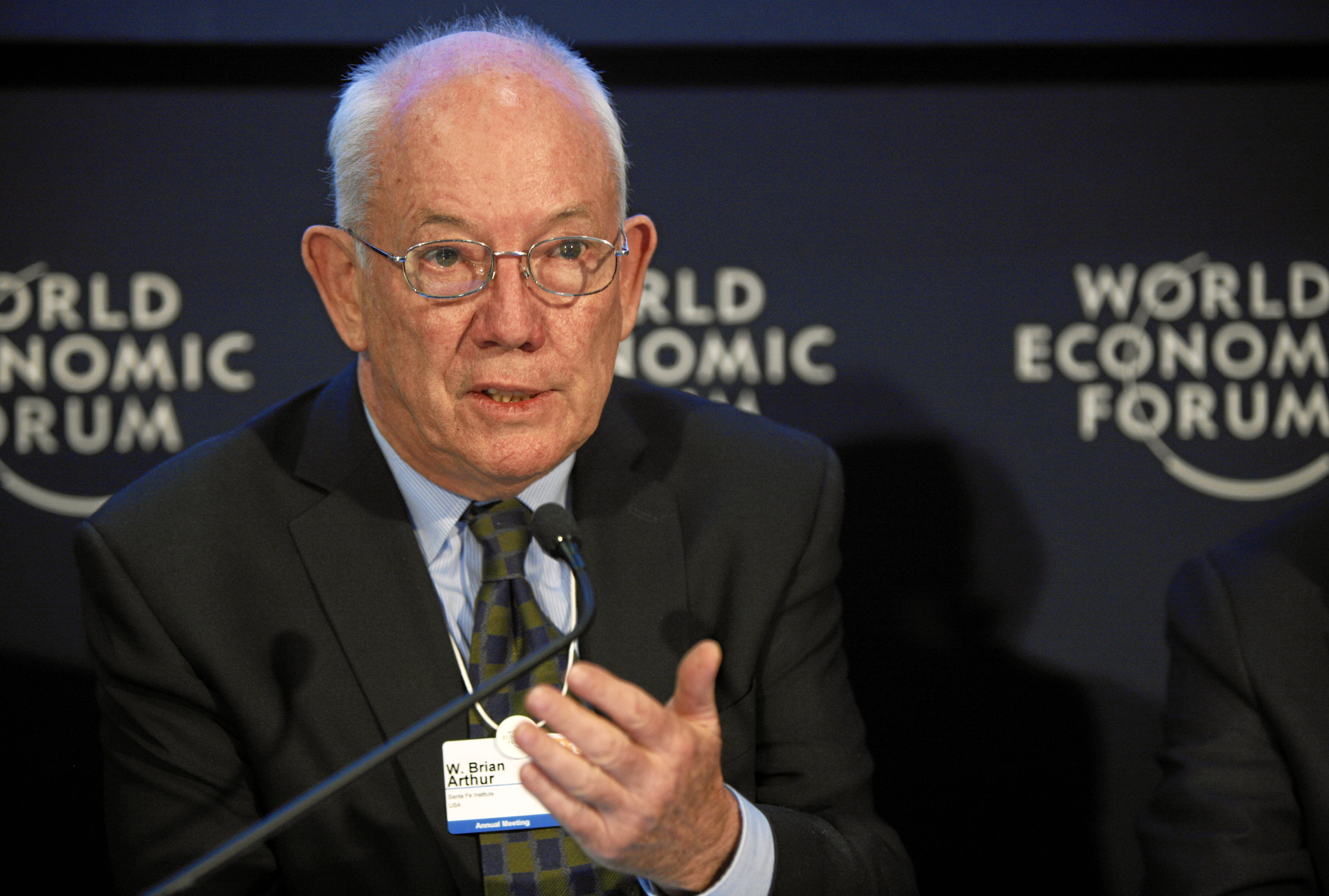
- Arthur at the World Economic Forum Annual Meeting, 2011
- Born: 31 July 1945 (age 81); Belfast, Northern Ireland
- Citizenship: Ireland and UK; United States (permanent resident)

Academic background
- Education: Queen's University Belfast; Lancaster University; University of Michigan; University of Berkeley
- Doctoral advisor: Stuart Dreyfus

Academic work
- Discipline: Complexity economics
- Institutions: Stanford University; Santa Fe Institute
- Notable ideas: El Farol Bar problem; Increasing returns

William Brian Arthur (born 31 July 1945) is a Belfast-born economist credited with developing the modern approach to increasing returns. He has lived and worked in Northern California for many years. He is an authority on economics in relation to complexity theory, technology and financial markets. He has been on the external faculty at the Santa Fe Institute, and a Visiting Researcher at the Intelligent Systems Lab at PARC. He is credited with the invention of the El Farol Bar problem.

== Biography ==
W. Brian Arthur was born in 1945 in Belfast, Northern Ireland. He received his BSc in electrical engineering at Queen's University Belfast (1966), an M. A. in Operational Research (1967) at Lancaster University, Lancaster, England, and an M. A. in Mathematics at the University of Michigan (1969). Arthur received his PhD in Operations Research (1973) and an M. A. in Economics (1973) from the University of California, Berkeley.

At age 37, Arthur was the youngest endowed chair holder at Stanford University.

Arthur is the former Morrison Professor of Economics and Population Studies; Professor of Human Biology, Stanford University, 1983–1996. He is the co-founder of the Morrison Institute for Population and Resource Studies at Stanford.

Arthur is one of the distinguished External Research Faculty members at the Santa Fe Institute, Santa Fe, New Mexico, USA. Arthur's long association with the Institute started in 1987 with the introduction and support of Stanford economist and winner of the Nobel Prize in Economics, Kenneth Arrow, and Philip Warren Anderson, winner of the Nobel Prize in Physics. Arthur was named as the first director of the interdisciplinary Economics Program at the Institute beginning in 1988. He was named the Citibank Professor at the institute in 1994, with the endowment of Citibank and then-Citibank CEO John S. Reed.

He served several terms on the Science Board 1988–2006, and Board of Trustees, 1994–2004, during his association with the institute.

Arthur was awarded a Guggenheim Fellowship in 1987. Arthur was also awarded the Schumpeter Prize in economics in 1990, and the (inaugural) Lagrange Prize for complexity science in 2008.

Arthur was awarded an honorary Doctor of Economic Sciences degree from the National University of Ireland (2000), and an Honorary Doctor of Science Degree (Honoris Causa) from Lancaster University on 9 December 2009.

Arthur and several other Santa Fe Institute researchers are profiled extensively in the book Complexity by M. Mitchell Waldrop.

He is a Fellow of the Econometric Society.

== Work ==
Arthur is noted for his works "studying the impacts of positive feedback or increasing returns in economies, and how these increasing returns magnify small, random occurrences in the market place." These principles are especially significant in technology-specific industries where network effects commonly occur.^{(EL1)}

=== Complexity theory ===
Arthur is one of the early economic researchers in the emerging complexity field. Specifically, his complexity studies focused on the "economics of high technology; how business evolves in an era of high technology; cognition in the economy; and financial markets."

Arthur's comments on the evolution of complexity theory as a different way of seeing and conducting scientific inquiry:

Complexity theory is really a movement of the sciences. Standard sciences tend to see the world as mechanistic. That sort of science puts things under a finer and finer microscope. In biology the investigations go from classifying organisms to functions of organisms, then organs themselves, then cells, and then organelles, right down to protein and enzymes, metabolic pathways, and DNA. This is finer and finer reductionist thinking.

The movement that started complexity looks in the other direction. It’s asking, how do things assemble themselves? How do patterns emerge from these interacting elements? Complexity is looking at interacting elements and asking how they form patterns and how the patterns unfold. It’s important to point out that the patterns may never be finished. They’re open-ended. In standard science this hits some things that most scientists have a negative reaction to. Science doesn’t like perpetual novelty.

=== How technology evolves ===
Arthur's book, The Nature of Technology: What it Is and How it Evolves, explores his belief that technology undergoes its own evolution, similar to Darwin's theory of evolution in Biology. Arthur's claim is that technology evolves out of earlier existing forms. He goes on to say that economies are not merely a container for these innovations, but rather economies arise as a result of new technological developments.

== See also ==
- Social software (social procedure)
- Inductive reasoning

== Publications ==
W. Brian Arthur has published several books, papers, articles and more. A selection:

- 1994. Increasing Returns and Path Dependence in the Economy. University of Michigan Press, Ann Arbor.
- 1996: Increasing returns and the new world of business. Harvard Business Review.
- 1997. The Economy as an Evolving Complex System II, edited with Steven Durlauf and David Lane, Addison-Wesley, Reading, MA, Series in the Sciences of Complexity.
- 2009. The Nature of Technology: What it is and How it Evolves. The Free Press and Penguin Books.
- 2021, "Foundations of Complexity Economics", overview article in Nature.
