= Symmetric game =

Game whose payoffs depend on strategies as opposed to players

In game theory, a symmetric game is a game where the payoffs for playing a particular strategy depend only on the other strategies employed, not on who is playing them. If one can change the identities of the players without changing the payoff to the strategies, then a game is symmetric. Symmetry can come in different varieties. Ordinally symmetric games are games that are symmetric with respect to the ordinal structure of the payoffs. A game is quantitatively symmetric if and only if it is symmetric with respect to the exact payoffs. A partnership game is a symmetric game where both players receive identical payoffs for any strategy set. That is, the payoff for playing strategy a against strategy b receives the same payoff as playing strategy b against strategy a.

== Symmetry in 2x2 games ==
	E	F
E	a, a	b, c
F	c, b	d, d

Only 12 out of the 144 ordinally distinct 2x2 games are symmetric. However, many of the commonly studied 2x2 games are at least ordinally symmetric. The standard representations of chicken, the Prisoner's Dilemma, and the Stag hunt are all symmetric games. Formally, in order for a 2x2 game to be symmetric, its payoff matrix must conform to the schema pictured to the right.

The requirements for a game to be ordinally symmetric are weaker, there it need only be the case that the ordinal ranking of the payoffs conform to the schema on the right.

== Symmetry and equilibria ==
Nash (1951) shows that every finite symmetric game has a symmetric mixed strategy Nash equilibrium. Cheng et al. (2004) show that every two-strategy symmetric game has a (not necessarily symmetric) pure strategy Nash equilibrium. Emmons et al. (2022) show that in every common-payoff game (a.k.a. team game) (that is, every game in which all players receive the same payoff), every optimal strategy profile is also a Nash equilibrium.

== Uncorrelated asymmetries: payoff neutral asymmetries ==
Symmetries here refer to symmetries in payoffs. Biologists often refer to asymmetries in payoffs between players in a game as correlated asymmetries. These are in contrast to uncorrelated asymmetries which are purely informational and have no effect on payoffs (e.g. see Hawk-dove game).

== The general case ==
A game with a payoff of $U_i\colon A_1\times A_2\times\cdots\times A_n\longrightarrow\R$ for player $i$, where $A_i$ is player $i$'s strategy set and $A_1=A_2=\ldots=A_N$, is considered symmetric if for any permutation $\pi$,

$U_{\pi(i)}(a_1,\ldots,a_i,\ldots,a_N) = U_{i}(a_{\pi(1)},\ldots,a_{\pi(i)},\ldots,a_{\pi(N)}).$

Partha Dasgupta and Eric Maskin give the following definition, which has been repeated since in the economics literature

$$U_i(a_1,\ldots,a_i,\ldots,a_N) = U_{\pi(i)}(a_{\pi(1)},\ldots,a_{\pi(i)},\ldots,a_{\pi(N)}).$$

However, this is a stronger condition that implies the game is not only symmetric in the sense above, but is a common-interest game, in the sense that all players' payoffs are identical.
