= Reinhard Selten =

German economist and Nobel Laureate (1930–2016)

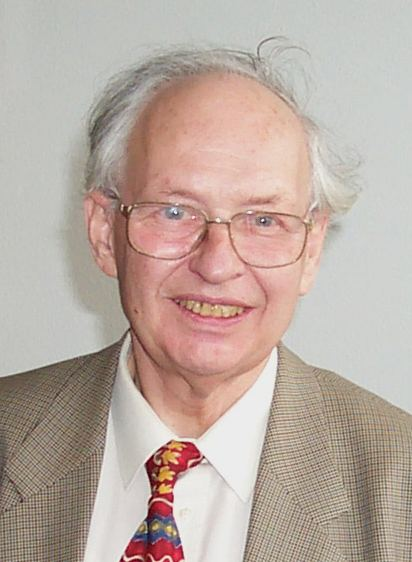
- Selten in 2001
- Born: Reinhard Justus Reginald Selten; 5 October 1930; Breslau, Weimar Germany (Wrocław, Poland)
- Died: 23 August 2016 (aged 85); Poznań, Poland
- Education: Goethe University Frankfurt
- Known for: Game theory
- Awards: Nobel Memorial Prize in Economic Sciences (1994)
- Scientific career
- Fields: Economics
- Workplaces: University of Bonn; Free University of Berlin
- Doctoral advisor: Wolfgang Franz
- Doctoral students: Eric van Damme; Rosemarie Nagel

Reinhard Justus Reginald Selten (German: [ˈʁaɪnhaʁt ˈzɛltn̩]; 5 October 1930 – 23 August 2016) was a German economist, who won the 1994 Nobel Memorial Prize in Economic Sciences (shared with John Harsanyi and John Nash). He is also well known for his work in bounded rationality and can be considered one of the founding fathers of experimental economics.

== Biography ==
Selten was born in Breslau (Wrocław) in Lower Silesia, now in Poland, to a Jewish father, Adolf Selten (a blind bookseller; d. 1942), and Protestant mother, Käthe Luther. Reinhard Selten was raised as Protestant.

After a brief family exile in Saxony and Austria, Selten returned to Hesse, Germany, after the war and, in high school, read an article in Fortune magazine about game theory by the business writer John D. McDonald. He recalled later, he would occupy his "mind with problems of elementary geometry and algebra" while walking back and forth to school during that time. He studied mathematics at Goethe University Frankfurt and obtained his diploma in 1957. He then worked as scientific assistant to Heinz Sauermann until 1967. In 1959, he married with Elisabeth Langreiner. They had no children. In 1961, he also received his doctorate in Frankfurt in mathematics with a thesis on the evaluation of n-person games.

He was a visiting professor at Berkeley and taught from 1969 to 1972 at the Free University of Berlin and, from 1972 to 1984, at Bielefeld University. He then accepted a professorship at the University of Bonn. There he built the BonnEconLab, a laboratory for experimental economic research, where he was active even after his retirement.

Selten was professor emeritus at the University of Bonn, Germany, and held several honorary doctoral degrees. He had been an Esperantist since 1959 and met his wife through the Esperanto movement. He was a member and co-founder of the International Academy of Sciences San Marino.

For the 2009 European Parliament election, he was the top candidate for the German wing of Europe – Democracy – Esperanto.

== Work ==
For his work in game theory, Selten won the 1994 Nobel Memorial Prize in Economic Sciences (shared with John Harsanyi and John Nash). Selten was Germany's first and, at the time of his death, only Nobel winner for economics. Among many other topics, he is credited with the first study of aggregative games.

He is also well known for his work in bounded rationality, and can be considered one of the founding fathers of experimental economics. With Gerd Gigerenzer he edited the book Bounded Rationality: The Adaptive Toolbox (2001). He developed an example of a game called Selten's Horse because of its extensive form representation. His last work was "Impulse Balance Theory and its Extension by an Additional Criterion".

He was noted for his publishing in non-refereed journals to avoid being forced to make unwanted changes to his work.

== Bibliography ==
- Preispolitik der Mehrproduktenunternehmung in der statischen Theorie, Berlin-Heidelberg-New York: Springer-Verlag, 1970, ISBN 978-3642488887 – in German
- General Equilibrium with Price-Making Firms (with Thomas Marschak), Lecture Notes in Economics and Mathematical Systems, Berlin-Heidelberg-New York: Springer-Verlag, 1974, ISBN 978-3662073698
- A General Theory of Equilibrium Selection in Games (with John C. Harsanyi), Cambridge, Massachusetts: MIT-Press. (1988)
- Models of Strategic Rationality, Theory and Decision Library, Series C: Game Theory, Mathematical Programming and Operations Research, Dordrecht-Boston-London: Kluwer Academic Publishers. (1988)
- Game Equilibrium Models IV, Berlin, New York, Springer Verlag, 1991, ISBN 978-3662073698.
- Rational Interaction – Essays in Honor of John C. Harsanyi, Berlin, New York, Springer-Verlag, 1992, ISBN 978-3642081361.
- Enkonduko en la Teorion de Lingvaj Ludoj – Ĉu mi lernu Esperanton? (with Jonathan Pool), Berlin-Paderborn: Akademia Libroservo, Institut für Kybernetik. (1995) – in Esperanto
- Game Theory and Economic Behavior: Selected Essays, 2. vol Cheltenham-Northampton: Edward Elgar Publishing. (1999)
- New edition of: Models of Strategic Rationality (1988), with a Chinese Introduction. Outstanding Academic Works on Economics by Nobel Prize Winners. Dordrecht-Boston-London: Kluwer Academic Publishers. (2000)
- Chinese Translation of: Models of Strategic Rationality (1988). Outstanding Academic Works on Economics by Nobel Prize Winners. Dordrecht-Boston-London: Kluwer Academic Publishers. (2000)
- Russian Translation of: A General Theory of Equilibrium Selection in Games (with John C. Harsanyi), Cambridge, Massachusetts: MIT-Press. (2000)
- Gigerenzer, G., & Selten, R. (Eds.). (2001). Bounded rationality: The adaptive toolbox. Cambridge, Massachusetts: MIT Press.
- Impulse Balance Theory and its Extension by an Additional Criterion. BoD. (2015)

== See also ==
- Subgame perfect Nash equilibrium
- List of Jewish Nobel laureates

Awards
Preceded by Robert W. Fogel; Douglass C. North	Laureate of the Nobel Memorial Prize in Economics; 1994; Served alongside: John C. Harsanyi, John F. Nash Jr.	Succeeded by Robert E. Lucas Jr.
