= El Farol Bar problem =

Problem in game theory

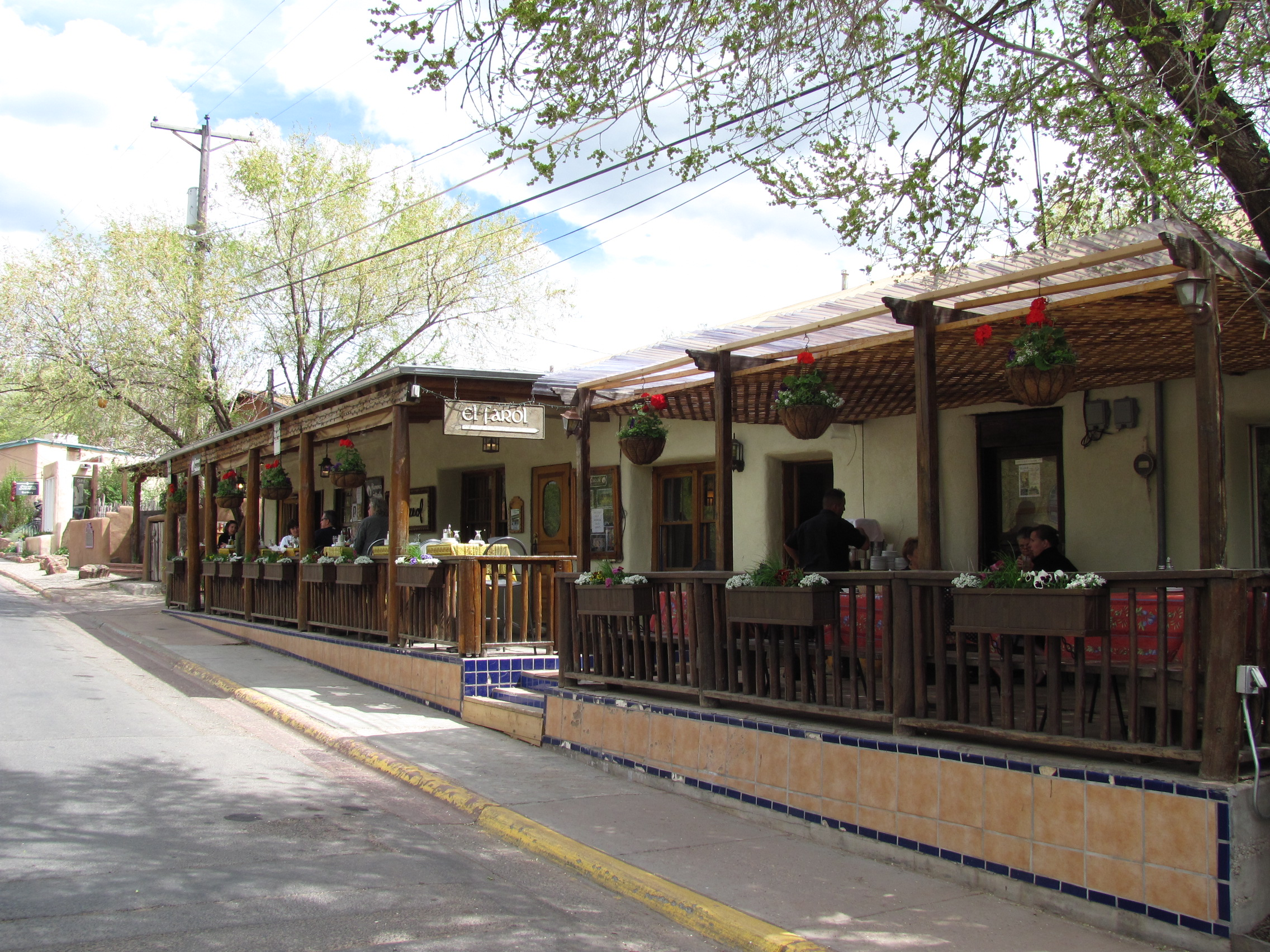
El Farol located on Canyon Road, Santa Fe, New Mexico

The El Farol bar problem is a problem in game theory. Every Thursday night, a fixed population want to go have fun at the El Farol Bar, unless it's too crowded.

- If less than 60% of the population go to the bar, they'll all have more fun than if they stayed home.
- If more than 60% of the population go to the bar, they'll all have less fun than if they stayed home.

Everyone must decide at the same time whether to go or not, with no knowledge of others' choices.

If everyone uses a deterministic pure strategy which is symmetric (same strategy for all players), it is guaranteed to fail no matter what it is. If the strategy suggests it will not be crowded, everyone will go, and thus it will be crowded; but if the strategy suggests it will be crowded, nobody will go, and thus it will not be crowded, but again no one will have fun. Better success is possible with a probabilistic mixed strategy. For the single-stage El Farol Bar problem, there exists a unique symmetric Nash equilibrium mixed strategy where all players choose to go to the bar with a certain probability, determined according to the number of players, the threshold for crowdedness, and the relative utility of going to a crowded or uncrowded bar compared to staying home. There are also multiple Nash equilibria in which one or more players use a pure strategy, but these equilibria are not symmetric. Several variants are considered in Game Theory Evolving by Herbert Gintis.

In some variants of the problem, the players are allowed to communicate before deciding to go to the bar. However, they are not required to tell the truth.

Named after a bar in Santa Fe, New Mexico, the problem was created in 1994 by W. Brian Arthur. However, under another name, the problem was formulated and solved dynamically six years earlier by B. A. Huberman and T. Hogg. See Kolkata Paise Restaurant Problem for extending it from binary choice (go to the bar or stay home) to multiple options for each player.
