= Stag hunt =

Conflict between safety and cooperation

	Stag	Hare
Stag	10, 10	1, 8
Hare	8, 1	5, 5
Fig. 1: Stag hunt example

In game theory, the stag hunt (also referred to as the assurance game, trust dilemma or common interest game) describes a situation or game where participants would be better off cooperating to achieve a more ambitious goal (hunting a stag together, which succeeds), but can choose a safer option (hunting a hare on one's own) that protects them from a bad outcome (hunting a stag alone, which fails, while the other hunts a hare). This sets up a stylized conflict between safety and social cooperation based on the mathematical payoffs of each option.

In the most common account of this dilemma, two hunters must decide separately, and without the other knowing, whether to hunt a stag or a hare. However, both hunters know the only way to successfully hunt a stag is with the other's help. One hunter can catch a hare alone with less effort and less time, but it is worth far less than a stag and has much less meat. But both hunters would be better off if both choose the more ambitious and more rewarding goal of getting the stag, giving up some autonomy in exchange for the other hunter's cooperation and added might.

This situation is often seen as a useful analogy for many kinds of social cooperation, such as international agreements on climate change.

The stag hunt problem originated with philosopher Jean-Jacques Rousseau in his Discourse on Inequality, although the most common mathematized formulation differs from the original presentation.

== Formal discussion ==
	Stag	Hare
Stag	a, a	c, b
Hare	b, c	d, d
Fig. 2: Generic symmetric stag hunt. See a concrete example at the beginning of the article.

Formally, a stag hunt is a game with two pure strategy Nash equilibria, that is, stable attractors where an individual player cannot improve their position with a different strategy if the other players' strategy remains constant—one that is risk dominant (hunting hares individually) and another that is payoff dominant (hunting a stag together). (Note: When both hunters choose the stag, one could not gain by changing to the hare, while the other still choosing the stag. The same scenario also happens when both choose the hare, thus reaching Nash equilibrium in both cases.) The payoff matrix in Figure 1 illustrates a generic stag hunt, where $a>b\ge d>c$.

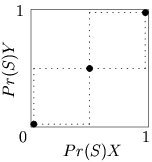

The stag hunt differs from the prisoner's dilemma in that in the stag hunt there are two pure-strategy Nash equilibria: one where both players cooperate, and one where both players defect. In the prisoner's dilemma, despite the fact that both players cooperating is Pareto efficient, the only pure Nash equilibrium is when both players choose to defect.

In addition to the pure strategy Nash equilibria, the stag hunt has one mixed strategy Nash equilibrium, that is, one in which the players choose either option with some probability. This equilibrium depends on the payoffs, but the risk dominance condition places a bound on the mixed strategy Nash equilibrium. No payoffs (that satisfy the above conditions including risk dominance) can generate a mixed strategy equilibrium where Stag is played with a probability higher than one half.

== The stag hunt and social cooperation ==
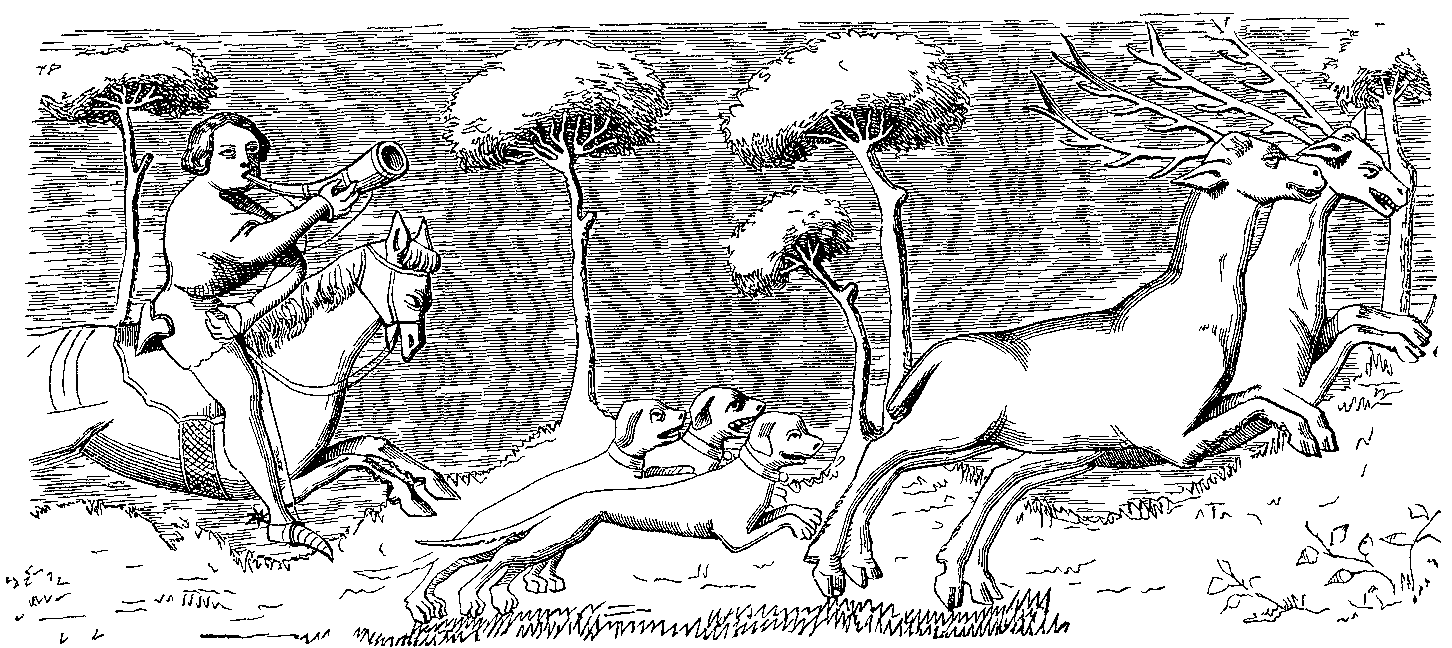
"Nature and Appearance of Deer" taken from Livre du Roy Modus, created in the 14th century

Although most authors focus on the prisoner's dilemma as the game that best represents the problem of social cooperation, some authors believe that the stag hunt represents an equally (or more) interesting context in which to study cooperation and its problems (for an overview see Skyrms 2004).

There is a substantial relationship between the stag hunt and the prisoner's dilemma. In biology many circumstances that have been described as prisoner's dilemma might also be interpreted as a stag hunt, depending on how fitness is calculated.

	Cooperate	Defect
Cooperate	3, 3	0, 5
Defect	5, 0	1, 1
Fig. 3: Prisoner's dilemma example

It is also the case that some human interactions that seem like prisoner's dilemmas may in fact be stag hunts. For example, suppose we have a prisoner's dilemma as pictured in Figure 3. The payoff matrix would need adjusting if players who defect against cooperators might be punished for their defection. For instance, if the expected punishment is −3, then the imposition of this punishment turns the above prisoner's dilemma into the stag hunt given at the introduction.

== Examples of the stag hunt ==
The original stag hunt dilemma is as follows: a group of hunters have tracked a large stag, and found it to follow a certain path. If all the hunters work together, they can kill the stag and all eat. If they are discovered, or do not cooperate, the stag will flee, and all will go hungry.

The hunters hide and wait along a path. An hour goes by, with no sign of the stag. Two, three, four hours pass, with no trace. A day passes. The stag may not pass every day, but the hunters are reasonably certain that it will come. However, a hare is seen by all hunters moving along the path.

If a hunter leaps out and kills the hare, he will eat, but the trap laid for the stag will be wasted and the other hunters will starve. There is no certainty that the stag will arrive; the hare is present. The dilemma is that if one hunter waits, he risks one of his fellows killing the hare for himself, sacrificing everyone else. This makes the risk twofold; the risk that the stag does not appear, and the risk that another hunter takes the kill.

In addition to the example suggested by Rousseau, David Hume provides a series of examples that are stag hunts. One example addresses two individuals who must row a boat. If both choose to row they can successfully move the boat. However, if one doesn't, the other wastes his effort. Hume's second example involves two neighbors wishing to drain a meadow. If they both work to drain it they will be successful, but if either fails to do his part the meadow will not be drained.

Several animal behaviors have been described as stag hunts. One is the coordination of slime molds. In times of stress, individual unicellular protists will aggregate to form one large body. Here if they all act together they can successfully reproduce, but success depends on the cooperation of many individual protozoa. Another example is the hunting practices of orcas (known as carousel feeding). Orcas cooperatively corral large schools of fish to the surface and stun them by hitting them with their tails. Since this requires that the fish have no way to escape, it requires the cooperation of many orcas.

Author James Cambias describes a solution to the game as the basis for an extraterrestrial civilization in his 2014 science fiction book A Darkling Sea. Carol M. Rose argues that the stag hunt theory is useful in 'law and humanities' theory. In international law, countries are the participants in a stag hunt. They can, for example, work together to improve good corporate governance.

== See also ==
- Common knowledge (logic)
- Discourse on Inequality
- Mutual knowledge
- Pluralistic ignorance
- Prisoner's dilemma
- Social contract
- Christmas truce
