= Sex allocation =

Biology theory

Sex allocation is the allocation of resources to male versus female reproduction in sexual species. Sex allocation theory tries to explain why many species produce equal number of males and females.

In dioecious species, where individuals are either male or female for their entire lifetimes, the allocation decision lies between producing male or female offspring. In sequential hermaphrodites, where individuals function as one sex early in life and then switch to the other, the allocation decisions lie in what sex to be first and when to change sex. Animals may be dioecious or sequential hermaphrodites. Sex allocation theory also applies to flowering plants, which can be dioecious, simultaneous hermaphrodites, have unisexual plants and hermaphroditic plants in the same population, have unisexual flowers and hermaphroditic flowers on the same plant or to have only hermaphroditic flowers.

== Fisher's principle and equal sex allocation ==
R.A. Fisher developed an explanation, known as Fisher's principle, of why sex ratios in many animals are 1:1. If there were 10 times more females in a population than males, a male would on average be able to mate with more partners than a female would. Parents who preferentially invested in producing male offspring would have a fitness advantage over those who preferentially produced females. This strategy would result in increasing numbers of males in the population, thus eliminating the original advantage of males. The same would occur if there were originally more males than females in a population. The evolutionarily stable strategy (ESS) in this case would be for parents to produce a 1:1 ratio of males and females.

This explanation assumed that males and females are equally costly for parents to produce. However, if one sex were more costly than the other, parents would allot their resources to their offspring differentially. If parents could have two daughters for the same cost as one male because males took twice the energy to rear, parents would preferentially invest in daughters. Females would increase in the population until the sex ratio was 2 females: 1 male, meaning that a male could have twice the offspring a female could. As a result, males will be twice as costly while producing twice as many offspring, so that males and females provide the same proportion of offspring in proportion to the investment the parent allotted, resulting in an ESS. Therefore, parents allot equal investment of effort in both sexes. More generally, the expected sex ratio is the ratio of the allotted investment between the sexes, and is sometimes referred to as Fisherian sex ratios.

However, there are many examples of organisms that do not demonstrate the expected 1:1 ratio or the equivalent investment ratio. The idea of equal allocation fails to explain these expected ratios because it assume that relatives do not interact with one another, and that the environment has no effect.

== Interactions between relatives ==
W.D. Hamilton hypothesized that non-Fisherian sex ratios can result when relatives interact with one another. He argued that if relatives experienced competition for resources, or benefited from the presence of other relatives, then sex ratios would become skewed. This led to a great deal of research on whether competition or cooperation between relatives results in differential sex ratios that do not support Fisher's principle.

=== Local resource competition ===
Local resource competition (LRC) was first hypothesized by Anne Clark. She argued that the African bushbaby (Otolemur crassicaudatus) demonstrated a male-biased sex ratio because daughters associated with mothers for longer periods of time than did sons. Since sons disperse further from the maternal territory than do daughters, they do not remain on the territories and do not act as competitors with mothers for resources. Clark predicted that the effect of the LRC on sex allocation resulted in a mother investing preferentially in male offspring to reduce competition between daughters and herself. By producing more male offspring that disperse and do not compete with her, the mother will have a greater fitness than she would if she had produced the ratio predicted by the equal investment theory.

Further research has found that LRC may influence the sex ratio in birds. Passerine birds demonstrate largely daughter-based dispersal, while ducks and geese demonstrate mainly male-based dispersal. Local resource competition has been hypothesized to be the reason that passerine birds are more likely to be female, while ducks and geese are more likely to have male offspring.

Other studies have hypothesized that LRC is likely to influence sex ratios in roe deer, as well as primates. Consistent with these hypotheses, the sex-ratios in roe deer and several primates have been found to be skewed towards the sex that does not compete with mothers.

=== Local mate competition ===
Local mate competition (LMC) can be considered a special type of LRC. Fig wasps lay fertilized eggs within figs, and no females disperse. In some species, males are wingless upon hatching and cannot leave the fig to seek mates elsewhere. Instead, males compete with their brothers in order to fertilize their sisters in the figs; after fertilization, the males die. In such a case, mothers would preferentially adjust the sex ratio to be female-biased, as only a few males are needed in order to fertilize all of the females. If there were too many males, competition between the males will result in some failing to mate, and the production of those males would therefore be a waste of the mother's resources. A mother that allotted more resources to the production of female offspring would therefore have greater fitness than one who produced fewer females.

Support for LMC influencing sex ratio was found by examining the sex ratios of different fig wasps. Species with wingless males that can only mate with sisters were predicted to have higher rates of female-biased sex ratios, while species with winged males that can travel to other figs to fertilize non-related females were predicted to have less biased sex ratios. Consistent with LMC influencing sex ratio, these predictions were found to be true. In the latter case, LMC is reduced, and investment in male offspring is less likely to be “wasted” from the mother's point of view.

Research on LMC has focused on insects, such as wasps and ants, because they often face strong LMC. Other animals that often disperse from natal groups are much less likely to experience LMC.

=== Local resource enhancement ===
Local resource enhancement (LRE) occurs when relatives help one another instead of competing with one another in LRC or LMC. In cooperative breeders, mothers are assisted by their previous offspring in raising new offspring. In animals with these systems, females are predicted to preferentially have offspring that are the helping sex if there are not enough helpers. However, if there are already enough helpers, it is predicted that females would invest in offspring of the other sex, as this would allow them to increase their own fitness by having dispersing offspring with a greater rate of reproduction than the helpers. It is also predicted that the strength of the selection upon the mothers to adjust the sex ratio of their offspring depends upon the magnitude of the benefits they gain from their helpers.

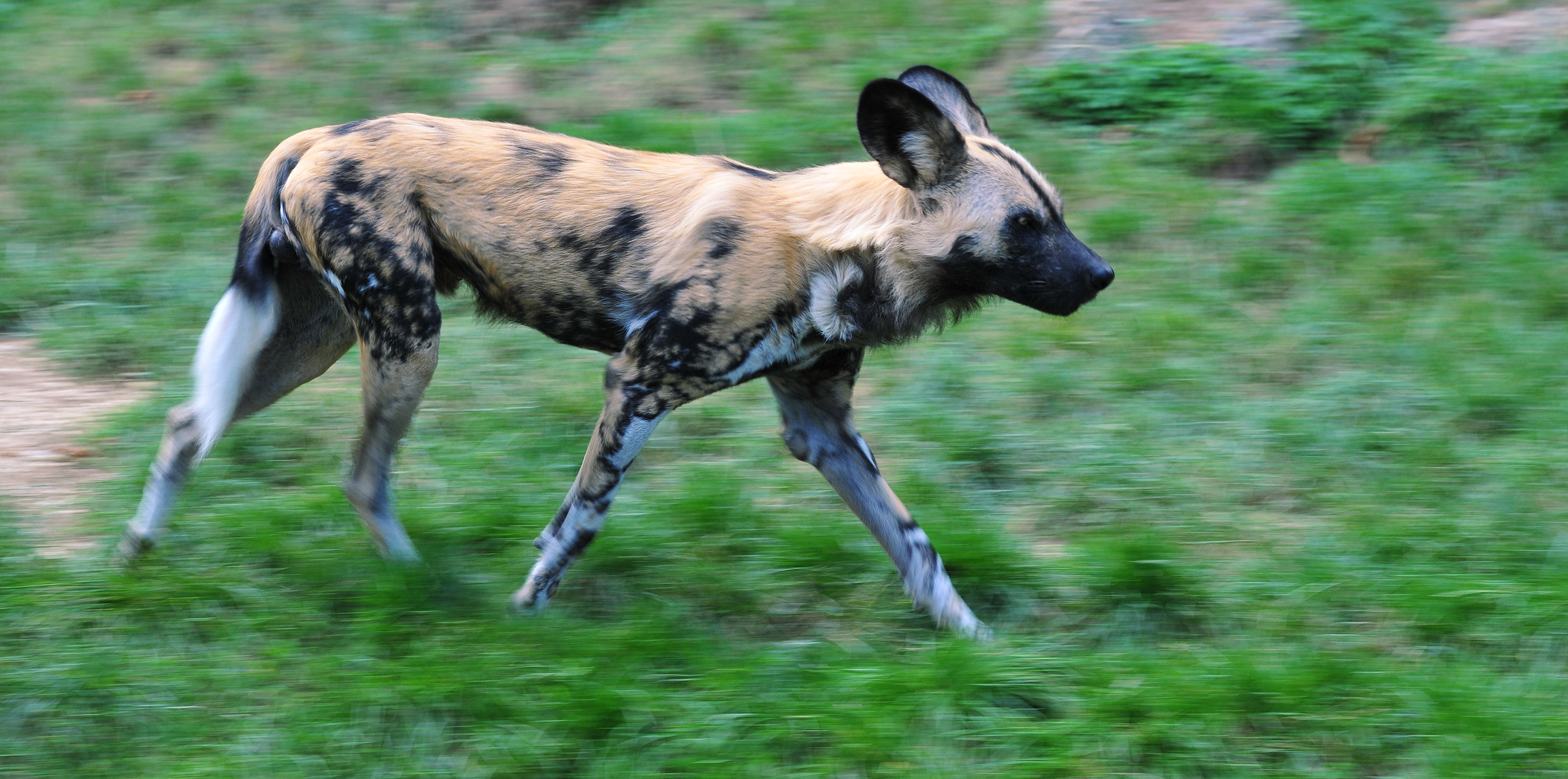
African wild dog

These predictions were found to be true in African wild dogs, where females disperse more rapidly than males from their natal packs. Males are therefore more helpful towards their mothers, as they remain in the same pack as her and help provide food for her and her new offspring. The LRE the males provide is predicted to result in a male-biased sex ratio, which is the pattern observed in nature. Consistent with predictions of LRE influencing sex ratios, African wild dog mothers living in smaller packs were seen to produce more male-biased sex ratios than mothers in a larger pack, since they had fewer helpers and would benefit more from additional helpers than mothers living in larger packs.

Evidence for LRE leading to sex ratios biased in favor of helpers has also been found in a number of other animals, including the Seychelles warbler (Acrocephalus sechellensis) and various primates.

== Trivers–Willard hypothesis ==
The Trivers-Willard hypothesis provides a model for sex allocation that deviates from Fisherian sex ratios. Trivers and Willard (1973) originally proposed a model that predicted individuals would skew the sex ratio of males to females in response to certain parental conditions, which was supported by evidence from mammals. Though individuals may not consciously decide to have fewer or more offspring of the same sex, their model suggested that individuals could be selected to adjust the sex ratio of offspring produced based on their ability to invest in offspring, if fitness returns for male and female offspring differ based on these conditions. While the Trivers-Willard hypothesis applied specifically to instances where preferentially having female offspring as maternal condition deteriorates was more advantageous, it spurred a great deal of further research on how environmental conditions can differentially affect sex ratios, and there are now a number of empirical studies that have found individuals adjust their ratio of male and female offspring.

=== Food availability ===
In many species, the abundance of food in a given habitat dictates the level of parental care and investment in offspring. This, in turn, influences the development and viability of the offspring. If food availability has differential effects on the fitness of male and female offspring, then selection should shift offspring sex ratios based on specific conditions of food availability. Appleby (1997) proposed evidence for conditional sex allocation in a study done on tawny owls (Strix aluco). In tawny owls, a female-biased sex ratio was observed in breeding territories where there was an abundance of prey (field voles). In contrast, in breeding territories with a scarcity of prey, a male-biased sex ratio was seen. This appeared to be adaptive because females demonstrated higher reproductive success when prey density was high, whereas males did not appear to have any reproductive advantage with high prey density. Appleby hypothesized that parents should adjust the sex ratio of their offspring based on the availability of food, with a female sex bias in areas of high prey density and a male sex bias in areas of low prey density. The results support the Trivers-Willard model, as parents produced more of the sex that benefited most from plentiful resources.

Wiebe and Bortolotti (1992) observed sex ratio adjustment in a sexually dimorphic (by size) population of American kestrels (Falco sparverius). In general, the larger sex in a species requires more resources than the smaller sex during development and is thus more costly for parents to raise. Wiebe and Bortolotti provided evidence that kestral parents produced more of the smaller (less costly) sex given limited food resources and more of the larger (more costly) sex given an abundance of food resources. These findings modify the Trivers-Willard hypothesis by suggesting sex ratio allocation can be biased by sexual size dimorphism as well as parental conditions.

=== Maternal condition or quality ===
A study by Clutton-Brock (1984) on red deer (Cervus elaphus), a polygynous species, examined the effects of dominance rank and maternal quality on female breeding success and sex ratios of offspring. Based on the Trivers-Willard model, Clutton-Brock hypothesized that the sex ratio of mammalian offspring may change according to maternal condition, where high-ranked females should produce more male offspring and low-ranked females should produce more female offspring. This is based on the assumption that high-ranked females are in better condition, so that they have more access to resources and can afford to invest more in their offspring. In the study, high-ranked females were shown to give birth to healthier offspring than low-ranked females, and the offspring of high-ranked females also developed into healthier adults. Clutton-Brock suggested that the advantage of being a healthy adult was more beneficial for male offspring because stronger males are more capable of defending harems of females during breeding seasons. Therefore, Clutton-Brock proposed that males produced by females in better conditions are more likely to have greater reproductive success in the future than males produced by females in poorer conditions. These findings support the Trivers-Willard hypothesis, as parental quality affected the sex of their offspring, in such a way as to maximize their reproductive investment.

=== Mate attractiveness and quality ===
Similar to the idea behind the Trivers-Willard hypothesis, studies show that mate attractiveness and quality may also explain differences in sex ratios and offspring fitness. Weatherhead and Robertson (1979) predicted that females bias the sex ratio of their offspring in favor of sons if they are mated to more attractive and better quality males. This is related to Fisher's “sexy son” hypothesis, which suggests a causal link between male attractiveness and the quality of sons based on the inheritance of “good genes” that should improve the reproductive success of sons. Fawcett (2007) predicted that it is adaptive for females to adjust their sex ratio to favor sons in response to attractive males. Based on a computer model, he proposed that if sexual selection favors costly male traits, i.e. ornamentation, and costly female preferences, females should produce more male offspring when they mate with an attractive male compared to an unattractive male. Fawcett proposed that there is a direct correlation between female bias for male offspring and attractiveness of their mate. Computer simulations have costs and constraints, and selection may be weaker in natural populations than it was in Fawcett's study. While his results provide support for the Trivers-Willard hypothesis that animals adaptively adjust the sex ratio of offspring due to environmental variables, further empirical studies are needed to see if sex ratio is adjusted in response to mate attractiveness.

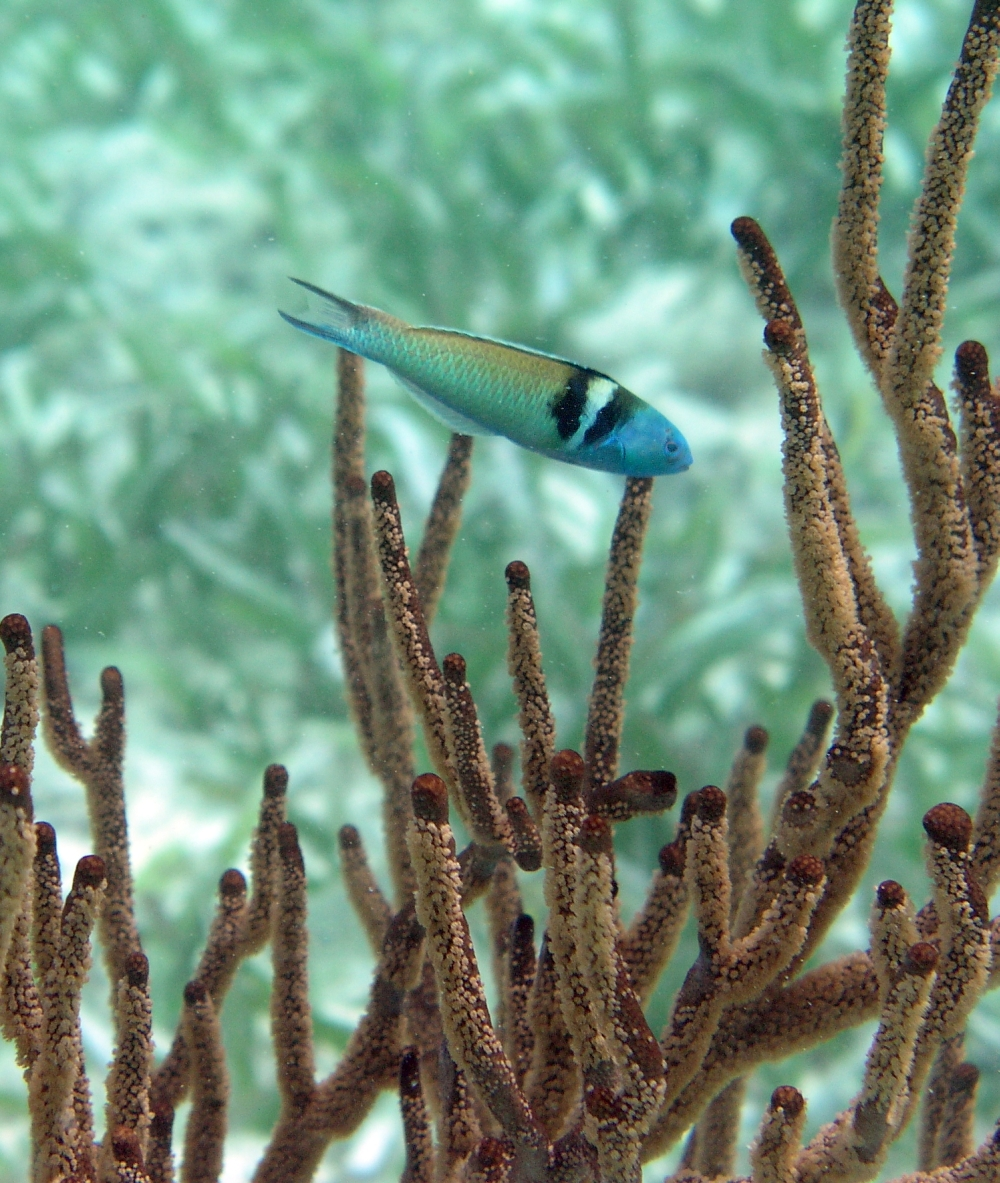
Bluehead wrasse

=== Sex change ===
The principles of the Trivers-Willard hypothesis can also be applied to sequentially hermaphroditic species, in which individuals undergo sex change. Ghiselin (1969) proposed that individuals change from one sex to another as they age and grow because larger body size provides a greater advantage to one sex than the other. For example, in the bluehead wrasse, the largest males have 40 times the mating success of smaller ones. Thus, as individuals age, they can maximize their mating success by changing from female to male. Removal of the largest males on a reef results in the largest females changing sex to male, supporting the hypothesis that competition for mating success drives sex change.

== Sex allocation in plants ==
A great deal of research has focused on sex allocation in plants to predict when plants would be dioecious, simultaneous hermaphrodites, or demonstrate both in the same population or plant. Research has also examined how outcrossing, which occurs when individual plants can fertilize and be fertilized by other individuals or selfing (self-pollination) affect sex allocation.

Selfing in simultaneous hermaphrodites has been predicted to favor allocating fewer resources to the male function, as it is hypothesized to be more advantageous for hermaphrodites to invest in female functions, so long as they have enough males to fertilize themselves. Consistent with this hypothesis, as selfing in wild rice (Oryza perennis) increases, the plants allocate more resources to the female function than to male.

Charlesworth and Charlesworth (1981) applied similar logic to both outcrossing and selfing species, and created a model that predicted when dioecy would be favored over hermaphroditism, and vice versa. The model predicted that dioecy evolves if investing in one sexual function has accelerating fitness benefits than investing in both sexual functions, while hermaphroditism evolves if investing in one sexual function had decreasingly lower fitness benefits. It has been difficult to measure exactly how much fitness individual plants are able to gain from investing in one or both sexual functions, and further empirical research is needed to support this model.

== Mechanisms of sex allocation decisions ==
Depending on the mechanism of sex determination for a species, decisions about sex allocation may be carried out in different ways.

In haplodiploid species, like bees and wasps, females control the sex of offspring by deciding whether or not to fertilize each egg. If she fertilizes the egg, it will become diploid and develop as a female. If she does not fertilize the egg, it will remain haploid and develop as a male. In an elegant experiment, researchers showed that female N. vitripennis parasitoid wasps altered the sex ratio in their offspring in response to the environmental cue of eggs laid by other females.

Historically, many theorists have argued that the Mendelian nature of chromosomal sex determination limits opportunities for parental control of offspring sex ratio. However, adaptive adjustment of sex ratio has been found among many animals, including primates, red deer, and birds. The exact mechanism of such allocation is unknown, but several studies indicate that hormonal, pre-ovulatory control may be responsible. For example, higher levels of follicular testosterone in mothers, signifying maternal dominance, correlated with a higher chance of forming a male embryo in cows. Higher corticosterone levels in breeding female Japanese quails were associated with female-biased sex ratios at laying.

In species that have environmental sex determination, like turtles and crocodiles, the sex of an offspring is determined by environmental features such as temperature and day length. The direction of bias differs between species. For example, in turtles with ESD, males are produced at lower temperatures, but in many alligators, males are produced at higher temperatures.
