= Complete mixing =

In evolutionary game theory, complete mixing refers to a modeling assumption where each individual in a population has an equal probability of interacting with any other individual. This means that during the evaluation phase of an evolutionary algorithm or simulation, individuals are assumed to have interacted with all other members of the population in pair-wise encounters, rather than interacting preferentially with certain individuals based on factors like spatial proximity.

This assumption is implicit in the replicator equation, a system of differential equations that represents one of the fundamental models in evolutionary game theory. However, this assumption usually does not hold for most organismic populations, since interactions typically occur in some spatial setting where individuals are more likely to interact with those physically closer to them.

Although the assumption of complete mixing is empirically violated in many real-world scenarios, it represents a form of scientific idealization that simplifies mathematical analysis. The question of whether this idealization significantly affects model conclusions has led researchers to investigate alternative models without complete mixing, such as cellular automata models and spatial game theory approaches.
