= Farsightedness (game theory) =

Concept in game theory involving long-term strategic planning

In game theory, farsightness refers to players’ ability to consider the long-term consequences of their strategies, beyond immediate payoffs, often formalized as farsighted stability where players anticipate future moves and stable outcomes.

In static games, players optimize payoffs based on current information, as in the Nash equilibrium, but farsightedness involves anticipating dynamic or repeated interactions, such as in coalition games like hedonic games where preferences shape long-term alliances. For example, in a repeated Prisoner's Dilemma, a farsighted player might cooperate to encourage future cooperation, unlike the one-shot case where defection prevails. Similarly, a player might refuse a small immediate payoff to build a more valuable alliance later.

Farsightedness assumes significant foresight and computational ability, which may be unrealistic in complex scenarios. In evolutionary settings, myopic strategies might dominate if immediate survival outweighs long-term planning.

== Applications ==
In evolutionary game theory, farsightedness contrasts with myopic adaptation, where strategies adjust based on immediate fitness. A farsighted strategy might aim for an evolutionarily stable strategy (ESS) that withstands long-term mutant challenges. In coalition settings, farsighted players assess how current choices affect future stability, rejecting short-term gains for long-term benefits, as seen in hedonic games. Farsighted stability captures this by modeling chains of responses predicting stable configurations.

== See also ==
- Evolutionary game theory
- Cooperative game theory
- Hedonic games
- Subgame perfect equilibrium
- Repeated game
- Evolutionarily stable strategy
