= Fisher's principle =

Evolutionary model that explains the sex ratio

Fisher's principle is an evolutionary model that explains why the sex ratio of most species that produce offspring through sexual reproduction is approximately 1:1 between males and females. A. W. F. Edwards has remarked that it is "probably the most celebrated argument in evolutionary biology".

Fisher's principle was outlined by Ronald Fisher in his 1930 book The Genetical Theory of Natural Selection (but has been incorrectly attributed as original to Fisher). Fisher couched his argument in terms of parental expenditure, and predicted that parental expenditure on both sexes should be equal. Sex ratios that are 1:1 are hence known as "Fisherian", and those that are not 1:1 are "non-Fisherian" or "extraordinary" and occur because they break the assumptions made in Fisher's model.

== Basic explanation ==
W. D. Hamilton gave the following simple explanation in his 1967 paper on "Extraordinary sex ratios", given the condition that males and females cost equal amounts to produce:

1. Suppose male births are less common than female.
2. A newborn male then has better mating prospects than a newborn female, and therefore can expect to have more offspring.
3. Therefore parents genetically disposed to produce males tend to have more than average numbers of grandchildren born to them.
4. Therefore the genes for male-producing tendencies spread, and male births become more common.
5. As the 1:1 sex ratio is approached, the advantage associated with producing males dies away.
6. The same reasoning holds if females are substituted for males throughout. Therefore 1:1 is the equilibrium ratio.

In modern language, the 1:1 ratio is the evolutionarily stable strategy (ESS).

== Parental investment ==
Fisher wrote the explanation described by Eric Charnov and James J. Bull as being "characteristically terse" and "cryptic": in Chapter 6: "Sexual Reproduction and Sexual Selection":

In organisms of all kinds the young are launched upon their careers endowed with a certain amount of biological capital derived from their parents. This varies enormously in amount in different species, but, in all, there has been, before the offspring is able to lead an independent existence, a certain expenditure of nutriment in addition, almost universally, to some expenditure of time or activity, which the parents are induced by their instincts to make for the advantage of their young. Let us consider the reproductive value of these offspring at the moment when this parental expenditure on their behalf has just ceased. If we consider the aggregate of an entire generation of such offspring it is clear that the total reproductive value of the males in this group is exactly equal to the total value of all the females, because each sex must supply half the ancestry of all future generations of the species. From this it follows that the sex ratio will so adjust itself, under the influence of Natural Selection, that the total parental expenditure incurred in respect of children of each sex, shall be equal; for if this were not so and the total expenditure incurred in producing males, for instance, were less than the total expenditure incurred in producing females, then since the total reproductive value of the males is equal to that of the females, it would follow that those parents, the innate tendencies of which caused them to produce males in excess, would, for the same expenditure, produce a greater amount of reproductive value; and in consequence would be the progenitors of a larger fraction of future generations than would parents having a congenital bias towards the production of females. Selection would thus raise the sex-ratio until the expenditure upon males became equal to that upon females.

== Development of the argument ==
Fisher's principle is an early example of a model in which genes for greater production of either sex become equalized in the population, because each sex supplies exactly half the genes of all future generations.

Fisher's principle is rooted in the concept of frequency-dependent selection, though Fisher's principle is not frequency-dependent selection per se. Frequency-dependent selection, in this scenario, is the logic that the probability of an individual being able to breed is dependent on the frequency of the opposite sex in relation to its own sex. It was first described by Darwin in 1871.

Fisher's principle extends frequency dependence to explain how natural selection can act on genes that affect the frequency of an individual's grandchildren without affecting the frequency of their children. Fisher predicted that parents will invest their resources equally between each sex of offspring, because each sex supplies exactly half the genes of all future generations. As a result, those genes that cause parents to invest unequally in the sexes will tend to be selected against. Fisher was aware that in humans, more boys are born, but boys are also more likely to die in infancy. As a consequence, he reasoned that because parents tend to invest less in boys – because more boys die before the end of the period of parental care – there is a higher rate of male births to equalise parental investment in each sex.

Fisher's principle is also a precursor to evolutionary game theory. R.H. MacArthur (1965) first suggested applying to sex ratios the language of game theory, and this was subsequently picked up by W.D. Hamilton (1967) who termed the equilibrium point the "unbeatable strategy". Hamilton's unbeatable strategy was refined by John Maynard Smith and George R. Price (1973) into their concept of the evolutionarily stable strategy, i.e. one which cannot be invaded by a mutant strategy.

Fisher's concept of parental expenditure (now termed parental investment), developed particularly by Robert Trivers, is now an important concept in ecology.

George C. Williams, Richard Dawkins, and Randolph M. Nesse cite Fisher's principle as an example that illustrates the dominance of individual-level selection over group selection because, regardless of the hypothetical sex imbalance of a group, the genes of a parental organism produce offspring of the less frequent sex in order to maximize their transmission to subsequent generations but at substantial cost to the group growth rate.

== Fisher's sources ==
Historical research by A.W.F. Edwards has shown that, although the idea has been attributed to Fisher, Charles Darwin had originally formulated a similar argument in the first edition of The Descent of Man but removed it for the second edition – Fisher only had a copy of the second edition – and quotes Darwin in The Genetical Theory of Natural Selection.

Carl Düsing of the University of Jena published a similar argument in three works between 1883 and 1884, which is essentially identical to Shaw and Mohler's later model. It has been argued that Darwin's argument and Fisher's are different, in that Darwin assumes monogamy whereas Fisher's does not; the same author contends that Fisher's argument is very much like Dusing's, except that Fisher introduced the idea of parental investment and calculated the sex ratio that should exist at the age of independence, which may precede the age of reproduction.
