= Unbeatable (disambiguation) =

Unbeatable is a 2025 video game.

Unbeatable may also refer to:

- Unbeatable (film), a 2013 Hong Kong–Chinese film by Dante Lam
- Unbeatable (game show), a British game show
- Unbeatable strategy, proposed by W.D. Hamilton in his 1967 paper on sex ratios
- Unbeatable, a 2011 Chinese TV series starring Hu Ge

== See also ==
- The Unbeatables, a 1993/1996/2002 Chinese drama serial
- The Unbeatables (film), or Underdogs, a 2013 Argentine film
