= Bishop–Cannings theorem =

The Bishop–Cannings theorem is a theorem in evolutionary game theory. It states that (i) all members of a mixed evolutionarily stable strategy (ESS) have the same payoff (Theorem 2), and (ii) that none of these can also be a pure ESS (from their Theorem 3). The usefulness of the results comes from the fact that they can be used to directly find ESSs algebraically, rather than simulating the game and solving it by iteration.

The theorem was formulated by Tim Bishop and Chris Cannings at Sheffield University, who published it in 1978.

A review is given by John Maynard Smith in his book Evolution and the Theory of Games, with proof in the appendix.
