= Evolutionarily stable set =

Set of strategies in game theory

In game theory an evolutionarily stable set (ES set), sometimes referred to as evolutionary stable sets, is a set of strategies, which score equally against each other, each of which would be an evolutionarily stable strategy (ESS) were it not for the other members of the set. ES sets were first defined by Thomas (1985ab).
