= Evolution and the Theory of Games =

Book by John Maynard Smith

- Cover of Evolution and the Theory of Games, with an exemplary ternary plot of frequency changes of three different strategies
- Author: John Maynard Smith
- Language: English
- Subject: Evolutionary game theory
- Genre: Non-fiction
- Publisher: Cambridge University Press
- Publication date: December 1982
- Publication place: United Kingdom
- Pages: 234 pp.
- ISBN: 0-521-28884-3
- OCLC: 8034750
- Dewey Decimal: 575 19
- LC Class: QH371 .M325 1982

Evolution and the Theory of Games is a book by the British evolutionary biologist John Maynard Smith on evolutionary game theory. The book was initially published in December 1982 by Cambridge University Press.

== Overview ==
In the book, John Maynard Smith summarises work on evolutionary game theory that had developed in the 1970s, to which he made several important contributions.

The main contribution of the book is in introducing the concept of Evolutionarily Stable Strategy (ESS). ESS states that for a set of behaviours to be conserved over evolutionary time, they must be the most beneficial avenue of action when common, so that no alternative behaviour can invade. Supposing, for instance, that in a population of frogs, males fight to the death over breeding ponds. This would be an ESS if any one cowardly frog that does not fight to the death always fares worse (in terms of evolutionary survival fitness). A more likely scenario is one in which fighting to the death is not an ESS because a frog might arise that will stop fighting if it realises that it is going to lose. This frog would thus reap the benefits of fighting, but not the ultimate cost. Hence, fighting to the death would easily be invaded by a mutation that causes this "informed fighting." Much complexity can develop from this.

The structure of the book is as follows: Following an introductory chapter, the basic model is outlined. Here the Hawk-Dove model is introduced its assumptions reviewed and then an extended model, playing the field, is outlined. Chapters then include The war of attrition, Games with genetic models and Learning the ESS. There are then two chapters on Mixed Strategies and three on Asymmetric games. These are followed by chapters entitled; Life history strategies and the size game, Honesty, bargaining and commitment and The evolution of cooperation. The main body of the book concludes with a Postscript. After the Postscript are 11 Appendices dealing with some more technical background and illustrative material. The technical appendices cover the following topics: Matrix notation for game theory / A game with two pure strategies always has an ESS / The Bishop-Cannings theorem / Dynamics and stability / Retaliation / Games between relatives / The war of attrition with random rewards / The ESS when the strategy set is defined by one or more continuous variables / To find the ESS from a set of recurrence relations / Asymmetric games with cyclic dynamics / The reiterated Prisoner's Dilemma

== Reception ==
In their review evolutionary game theory, its past and likely influence in the future, Traulsen and Glynatsi (2023) find that Maynard Smith's book ‘Evolution and the theory of games’ ranks first in terms of citations within the field. This they argue demonstrates the substantial influence that he has had on the field (Traulsen and Glynatsi, 2023, page 2.

Bennett (1983) reviewed the book in the European Journal of Operational Research as did Mart Gross (1984) in The Quarterly Review of Biology.

== See also ==
- Evolutionary biology
