= Unbeatable strategy =

Idea proposed by biologist W.D. Hamilton in 1967

In biology, the idea of an unbeatable strategy was proposed by W.D. Hamilton in his 1967 paper on sex ratios in Science. In this paper Hamilton discusses sex ratios as strategies in a game, and cites Verner as using this language in his 1965 paper which "claims to show that, given factors causing fluctuations of the population's primary sex ratio, a 1:1 sex-ratio production proves the best overall genotypic strategy".

"In the way in which the success of a chosen sex ratio depends on choices made by the co-parasitizing females, this problem resembles certain problems discussed in the "theory of games." In the foregoing analysis a game-like element, of a kind, was present and made necessary the use of the word unbeatable to describe the ratio finally established. This word was applied in just the same sense in which it could be applied to the "minimax" strategy of a zero-sum two-person game. Such a strategy should not, without qualification, be called optimum because it is not optimum against -although unbeaten by- any strategy differing from itself. This is exactly the case with the "unbeatable" sex ratios referred to." Hamilton (1967).

"[...] But if, on the contrary, players of such a game were motivated to outscore, they would find that $1/4,$ is beaten by a higher ratio, $x^*$; the value of $x$ which gives its player the greatest possible advantage over the player playing $x_0$, is found to be given by the relationship $x^*=(2x_0)^{1/2} -x_0$ and shows $1/2$ to be the unbeatable play." Hamilton (1967).

The concept can be traced through R.A. Fisher (1930) to Darwin (1859); see Edwards (1998). Hamilton did not explicitly define the term "unbeatable strategy" or apply the concept beyond the evolution of sex-ratios, but the idea was very influential. George R. Price generalised the verbal argument, which was then formalised mathematically by John Maynard Smith, into the evolutionarily stable strategy (ESS).
