= Mathematical and theoretical biology =

Branch of biology

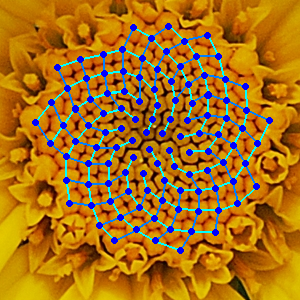
Yellow chamomile head showing the Fibonacci numbers in spirals consisting of 21 (blue) and 13 (aqua). Such arrangements have been noticed since the Middle Ages and can be used to make mathematical models of a wide variety of plants.

Mathematical and theoretical biology, or biomathematics, is a branch of biology which employs theoretical analysis, mathematical modeling, and abstractions about living organisms to investigate the principles that govern the structure, development, and behavior of biological systems. It can be understood in contrast to experimental biology, which involves the conduction of experiments to obtain evidence in order to construct and test theories. The field is sometimes called mathematical biology or biomathematics to emphasize the mathematical aspect, or as theoretical biology to highlight the theoretical aspect. Theoretical biology focuses more on the development of theoretical principles for biology, while mathematical biology focuses on the application of mathematical tools to study biological systems. These terms often converge, for instance in the topics of Artificial Immune Systems or Amorphous Computation.

Mathematical biology aims at developing mathematical representations and models of biological processes, using the techniques and tools of applied mathematics. It can be useful in both theoretical and practical research. Describing systems quantitatively allows for more precise predictions about those systems and the isolation and consistent analysis of features which might not be immediately obvious to an observer noting down qualitative features.

Because of the complexity of living systems, theoretical biology employs several fields of mathematics, and has contributed to the development of new techniques.

== History ==
=== Early history ===
Mathematics has been used in biology as early as the 13th century, when Fibonacci used the famous Fibonacci series to describe a growing population of rabbits. In the 18th century, Daniel Bernoulli applied mathematics to describe the effect of smallpox on the human population. Thomas Malthus' 1789 essay on the growth of the human population was based on the concept of exponential growth. Pierre François Verhulst formulated the logistic growth model in 1836.

Fritz Müller described the evolutionary benefits of what is now called Müllerian mimicry in 1879, in an account notable for being the first use of a mathematical argument in evolutionary ecology to show how powerful the effect of natural selection would be, unless one includes Malthus's discussion of the effects of population growth that influenced Charles Darwin: Malthus argued that growth would be exponential (he uses the word "geometric") while resources (the environment's carrying capacity) could only grow arithmetically.

The term "theoretical biology" was first used as a monograph title by Johannes Reinke in 1901, and soon after by Jakob von Uexküll in 1920. One founding text is considered to be On Growth and Form (1917) by D'Arcy Thompson, and other early pioneers include Ronald Fisher, Hans Leo Przibram, Vito Volterra, Nicolas Rashevsky and Conrad Hal Waddington.

=== Recent growth ===
Interest in the field has grown rapidly from the 1960s onwards. Some reasons for this include:

- The rapid growth of data-rich information sets, due to the genomics revolution, which are difficult to understand without the use of analytical tools
- Recent development of mathematical tools such as chaos theory to help understand complex, non-linear mechanisms in biology
- An increase in computing power, which facilitates calculations and simulations not previously possible
- An increasing interest in in silico experimentation due to ethical considerations, risk, unreliability and other complications involved in human and non-human animal research

== Areas of research ==
Several areas of specialized research in mathematical and theoretical biology as well as external links to related projects in various universities are concisely presented in the following subsections, including also a large number of appropriate validating references from a list of several thousands of published authors contributing to this field. Many of the included examples are characterised by highly complex, nonlinear mechanisms, as it is being increasingly recognised that such examples may be best understood through a combination of mathematical, logical, physical/chemical, molecular and computational models.

=== Abstract relational biology ===
Abstract relational biology (ARB) is concerned with the study of general, relational models of complex biological systems, usually abstracting out specific morphological, or anatomical, structures. Some of the simplest models in ARB are the Metabolic-Replication, or (M,R)--systems introduced by Robert Rosen in 1957–1958 as abstract, relational models of cellular and organismal organization.

Other approaches include the notion of autopoiesis developed by Maturana and Varela, Kauffman's Work-Constraints cycles, and more recently the notion of closure of constraints.

=== Algebraic biology ===
Algebraic biology (also known as symbolic systems biology) applies the algebraic methods of symbolic computation to the study of biological problems, especially in genomics, proteomics, analysis of molecular structures and study of genes.

=== Complex systems biology ===
An elaboration of systems biology to understand the more complex life processes was developed since 1970 in connection with molecular set theory, relational biology and algebraic biology.

=== Computer models and automata theory ===
A monograph on this topic summarizes an extensive amount of published research in this area up to 1986, including subsections in the following areas: computer modeling in biology and medicine, arterial system models, neuron models, biochemical and oscillation networks, quantum automata, quantum computers in molecular biology and genetics, cancer modelling, neural nets, genetic networks, abstract categories in relational biology, metabolic-replication systems, category theory applications in biology and medicine, automata theory, cellular automata, tessellation models and complete self-reproduction, chaotic systems in organisms, relational biology and organismic theories.

Modeling cell and molecular biology

This area has received a boost due to the growing importance of molecular biology.

- Mechanics of biological tissues
- Theoretical enzymology and enzyme kinetics
- Cancer modelling and simulation
- Modelling the movement of interacting cell populations
- Mathematical modelling of scar tissue formation
- Mathematical modelling of intracellular dynamics
- Mathematical modelling of the cell cycle
- Mathematical modelling of apoptosis

Modelling physiological systems

- Modelling of arterial disease
- Multi-scale modelling of the heart
- Modelling electrical properties of muscle interactions, as in bidomain and monodomain models

=== Computational neuroscience ===
Computational neuroscience (also known as theoretical neuroscience or mathematical neuroscience) is the theoretical study of the nervous system.

=== Evolutionary biology ===
Ecology and evolutionary biology have traditionally been the dominant fields of mathematical biology.

Evolutionary biology has been the subject of extensive mathematical theorizing. The traditional approach in this area, which includes complications from genetics, is population genetics. Most population geneticists consider the appearance of new alleles by mutation, the appearance of new genotypes by recombination, and changes in the frequencies of existing alleles and genotypes at a small number of gene loci. When infinitesimal effects at a large number of gene loci are considered, together with the assumption of linkage equilibrium or quasi-linkage equilibrium, one derives quantitative genetics. Ronald Fisher made fundamental advances in statistics, such as analysis of variance, via his work on quantitative genetics. Another important branch of population genetics that led to the extensive development of coalescent theory is phylogenetics. Phylogenetics is an area that deals with the reconstruction and analysis of phylogenetic (evolutionary) trees and networks based on inherited characteristics. Traditional population genetic models deal with alleles and genotypes, and are frequently stochastic.

Many population genetics models assume that population sizes are constant. Variable population sizes, often in the absence of genetic variation, are treated by the field of population dynamics. Work in this area dates back to the 19th century, and even as far as 1798 when Thomas Malthus formulated the first principle of population dynamics, which later became known as the Malthusian growth model. The Lotka–Volterra predator-prey equations are another famous example. Population dynamics overlap with another active area of research in mathematical biology: mathematical epidemiology, the study of infectious disease affecting populations. Various models of the spread of infections have been proposed and analyzed, and provide important results that may be applied to health policy decisions.

In evolutionary game theory, developed first by John Maynard Smith and George R. Price, selection acts directly on inherited phenotypes, without genetic complications. This approach has been mathematically refined to produce the field of adaptive dynamics.

=== Mathematical biophysics ===
The earlier stages of mathematical biology were dominated by mathematical biophysics, described as the application of mathematics in biophysics, often involving specific physical/mathematical models of biosystems and their components or compartments.

The following is a list of mathematical descriptions and their assumptions.

==== Deterministic processes (dynamical systems) ====
A fixed mapping between an initial state and a final state. Starting from an initial condition and moving forward in time, a deterministic process always generates the same trajectory, and no two trajectories cross in state space.

- Difference equations/Maps – discrete time, continuous state space.
- Ordinary differential equations – continuous time, continuous state space, no spatial derivatives. See also: Numerical ordinary differential equations.
- Partial differential equations – continuous time, continuous state space, spatial derivatives. See also: Numerical partial differential equations.
- Logical deterministic cellular automata – discrete time, discrete state space. See also: Cellular automaton.

==== Stochastic processes (random dynamical systems) ====
A random mapping between an initial state and a final state, making the state of the system a random variable with a corresponding probability distribution.

- Non-Markovian processes – generalized master equation – continuous time with memory of past events, discrete state space, waiting times of events (or transitions between states) discretely occur.
- Jump Markov process – master equation – continuous time with no memory of past events, discrete state space, waiting times between events discretely occur and are exponentially distributed. See also: Monte Carlo method for numerical simulation methods, specifically dynamic Monte Carlo method and Gillespie algorithm.
- Continuous Markov process – stochastic differential equations or a Fokker–Planck equation – continuous time, continuous state space, events occur continuously according to a random Wiener process.

==== Spatial modelling and dynamical systems ====
One classic work in this area is Alan Turing's paper on morphogenesis entitled The Chemical Basis of Morphogenesis, published in 1952 in the Philosophical Transactions of the Royal Society.

- Travelling waves in a wound-healing assay
- Swarming behaviour
- A mechanochemical theory of morphogenesis
- Biological pattern formation
- Spatial distribution modeling using plot samples
- Turing patterns

=== Geometric organisation and spatial patterning ===
Many biological systems exhibit recurring geometric and spatial patterns, and the analysis of these forms is an established area of biomathematics. Mathematical models and dynamical systems are used to describe how such patterns arise, how they scale with size or number, and how they relate to underlying biological processes and constraints.

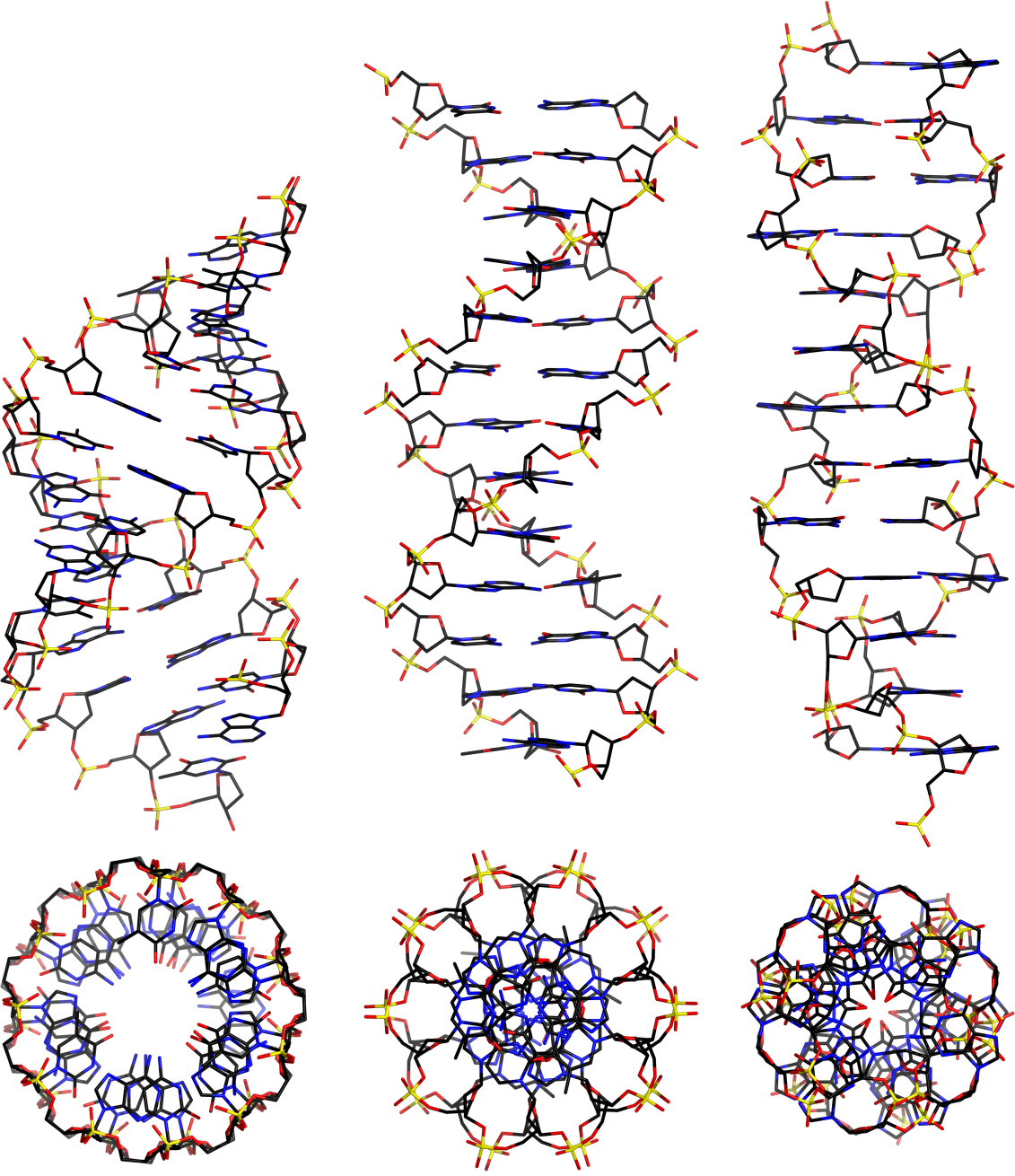
Different conformations of DNA illustrating molecular‑scale geometric organisation.

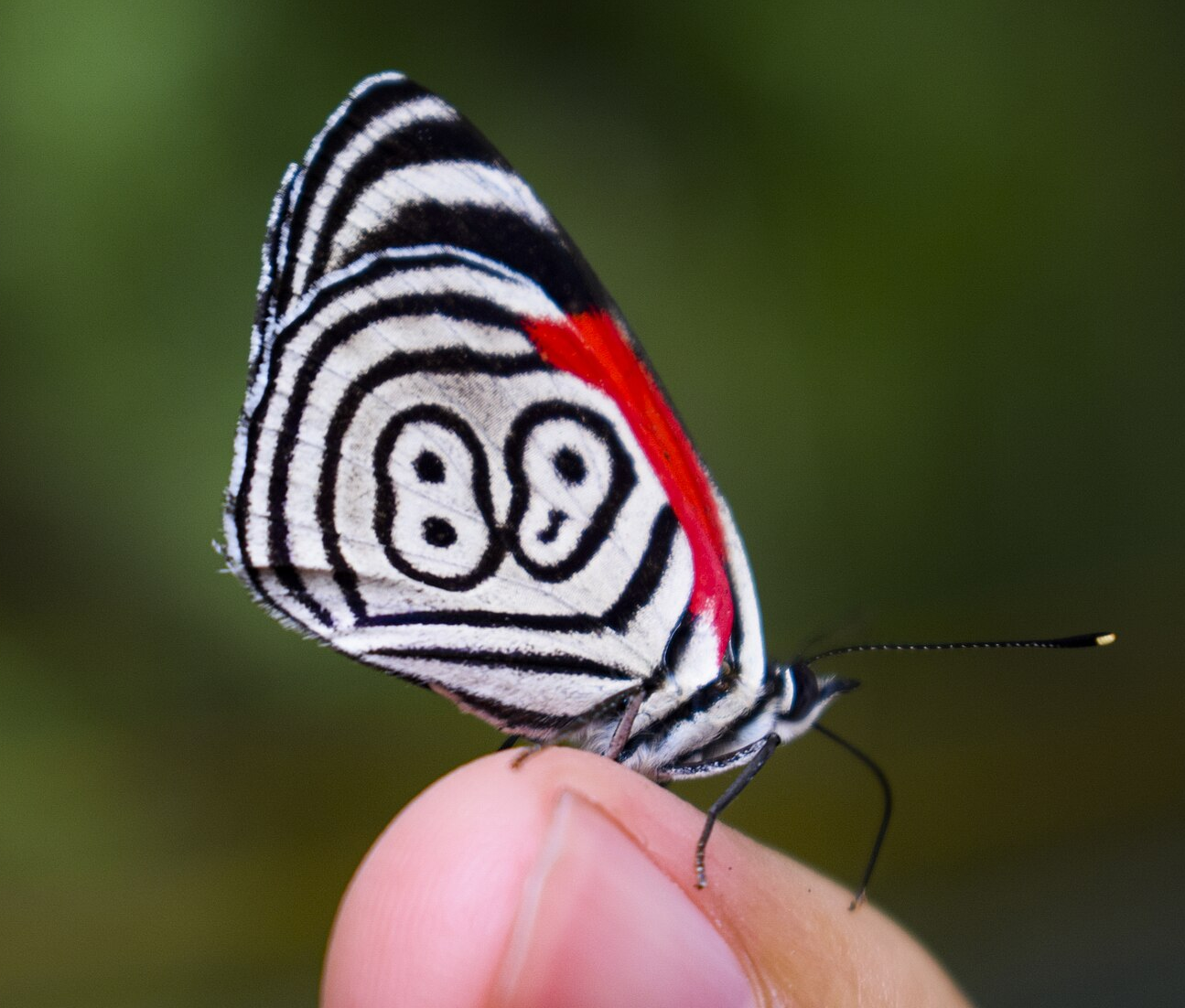
Wing pattern of Diaethria clymena with a distinctive “88” marking, often modelled using reaction–diffusion mechanisms described by Alan Turing.

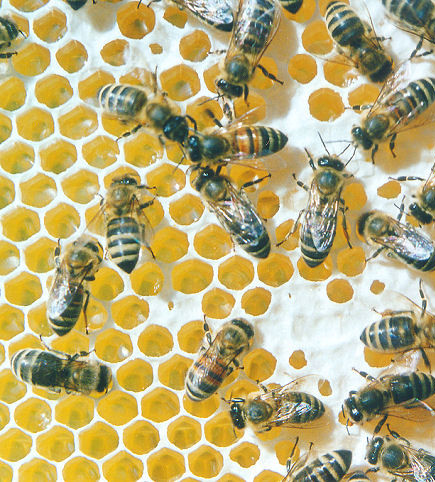
Worker honeybees (Apis mellifera) build hexagonal wax combs that exemplify geometric optimisation.

Geometric organization appears across multiple levels of biological organization. At the molecular scale, mathematical approaches are used to study the geometry of protein folding, DNA packing, membrane structures, and the shapes of biomolecules, which can often be described using concepts from molecular geometry, VSEPR theory, and stereochemistry. At this level, regular polyhedral and symmetric forms, such as the capsids of many icosahedral or helical viruses, provide classic examples of mathematically constrained biological structures.

At the organismal level, well‑known examples include phyllotaxis in plants, where leaves and florets form spiral arrangements often related to golden‑angle packing; animal coat patterns such as spots and stripes; and branching structures such as the vascular system, bronchial tree, neuronal arborisation, and tree canopies. In marine and other organisms, shells and skeletons can exhibit helical, logarithmic spiral, lattice‑like, or radially symmetric forms that can be described with geometric and growth models.

At ecological and landscape scales, spatial vegetation patterns, coral growth forms, and other large‑scale structures can also be analysed using geometric and dynamical models. Examples include banded and spotted vegetation in semi‑arid ecosystems, patchy distributions of organisms arising from spatial interactions, and branching or reef‑like structures in marine environments.

Several mathematical frameworks are used to study these phenomena. Reaction–diffusion models describe the emergence of spatial patterns such as stripes, spots, and spirals in developing tissues. Fractal and fractal‑based models are used to analyse branching networks and self‑similar structures in organisms and ecosystems. Models of Phyllotaxis explain the appearance of spiral arrangements and regular packing in plant growth.

=== Mathematical methods ===
A mathematical model of a biological system consists of a system of mathematical equations or relationships which describes various properties of a system, their relationship, and their evolution over time. The solution of these equations, by either analytical or numerical means, predicts how the biological system behaves either over time or at equilibrium. There are many different types of equations and the type of behavior that can occur is dependent on both the model and the equations used. The model often makes assumptions about the system. The equations may also make assumptions about the nature of what may occur.

=== Molecular set theory ===
Molecular set theory is a mathematical formulation of the wide-sense chemical kinetics of biomolecular reactions in terms of sets of molecules and their chemical transformations represented by set-theoretical mappings between molecular sets. It was introduced by Anthony Bartholomay, and its applications were developed in mathematical biology and especially in mathematical medicine. In a more general sense, Molecular set theory is the theory of molecular categories defined as categories of molecular sets and their chemical transformations represented as set-theoretical mappings of molecular sets. The theory has also contributed to biostatistics and the formulation of clinical biochemistry problems in mathematical formulations of pathological, biochemical changes of interest to Physiology, Clinical Biochemistry and Medicine.

=== Organizational biology ===
Theoretical approaches to biological organization aim to understand the interdependence between the parts of organisms. They emphasize the circularities that these interdependences lead to. Theoretical biologists developed several concepts to formalize this idea.

For example, abstract relational biology (ARB) is concerned with the study of general, relational models of complex biological systems, usually abstracting out specific morphological, or anatomical, structures. Some of the simplest models in ARB are the Metabolic-Replication, or (M,R)--systems introduced by Robert Rosen in 1957–1958 as abstract, relational models of cellular and organismal organization.

== Model example: the cell cycle ==
The eukaryotic cell cycle is very complex and has been the subject of intense study, since its misregulation leads to cancers. It is possibly a good example of a mathematical model as it deals with simple calculus but gives valid results. Two research groups have produced several models of the cell cycle simulating several organisms. They have recently produced a generic eukaryotic cell cycle model that can represent a particular eukaryote depending on the values of the parameters, demonstrating that the idiosyncrasies of the individual cell cycles are due to different protein concentrations and affinities, while the underlying mechanisms are conserved (Csikasz-Nagy et al., 2006).

By means of a system of ordinary differential equations these models show the change in time (dynamical system) of the protein inside a single typical cell; this type of model is called a deterministic process (whereas a model describing a statistical distribution of protein concentrations in a population of cells is called a stochastic process).

To obtain these equations an iterative series of steps must be done: first the several models and observations are combined to form a consensus diagram and the appropriate kinetic laws are chosen to write the differential equations, such as rate kinetics for stoichiometric reactions, Michaelis-Menten kinetics for enzyme substrate reactions and Goldbeter–Koshland kinetics for ultrasensitive transcription factors, afterwards the parameters of the equations (rate constants, enzyme efficiency coefficients and Michaelis constants) must be fitted to match observations; when they cannot be fitted the kinetic equation is revised and when that is not possible the wiring diagram is modified. The parameters are fitted and validated using observations of both wild type and mutants, such as protein half-life and cell size.

To fit the parameters, the differential equations must be studied. This can be done either by simulation or by analysis. In a simulation, given a starting vector (list of the values of the variables), the progression of the system is calculated by solving the equations at each time-frame in small increments.

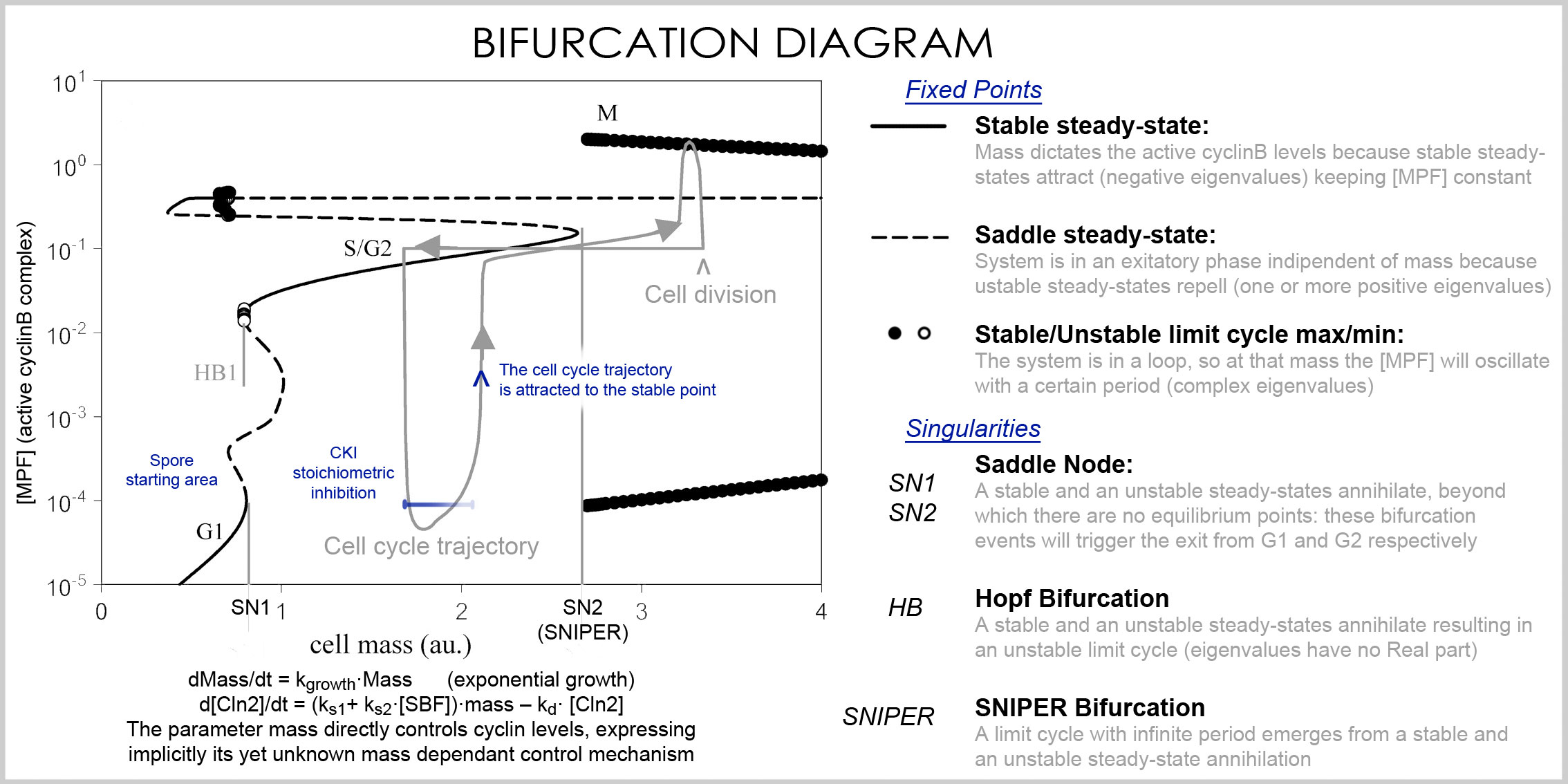

In analysis, the properties of the equations are used to investigate the behavior of the system depending on the values of the parameters and variables. A system of differential equations can be represented as a vector field, where each vector described the change (in concentration of two or more protein) determining where and how fast the trajectory (simulation) is heading. Vector fields can have several special points: a stable point, called a sink, that attracts in all directions (forcing the concentrations to be at a certain value), an unstable point, either a source or a saddle point, which repels (forcing the concentrations to change away from a certain value), and a limit cycle, a closed trajectory towards which several trajectories spiral towards (making the concentrations oscillate).

A better representation, which handles the large number of variables and parameters, is a bifurcation diagram using bifurcation theory. The presence of these special steady-state points at certain values of a parameter (e.g. mass) is represented by a point and once the parameter passes a certain value, a qualitative change occurs, called a bifurcation, in which the nature of the space changes, with profound consequences for the protein concentrations: the cell cycle has phases (partially corresponding to G1 and G2) in which mass, via a stable point, controls cyclin levels, and phases (S and M phases) in which the concentrations change independently, but once the phase has changed at a bifurcation event (Cell cycle checkpoint), the system cannot go back to the previous levels since at the current mass the vector field is profoundly different and the mass cannot be reversed back through the bifurcation event, making a checkpoint irreversible. In particular the S and M checkpoints are regulated by means of special bifurcations called a Hopf bifurcation and an infinite period bifurcation.

== Software ==
- COPASI
- Systems Biology Simulation Core Library
- Virtual Cell
- COMSOL Multiphysics

== See also ==
- Biological applications of bifurcation theory
- Biophysics
- Biostatistics
- Cellular model
- Entropy and life
- Ewens's sampling formula
- Journal of Theoretical Biology
- List of bioinformatics software
- Logistic function
- Mathematical modelling of infectious disease
- Metabolic network modelling
- Molecular modelling
- Morphometrics
- Population genetics
- Spring school on theoretical biology
- Statistical genetics
- Theoretical ecology
- Turing pattern
