= Fisher's fundamental theorem of natural selection =

Principle relating genetic variance to fitness

Fisher's fundamental theorem of natural selection is an idea about genetic variance in population genetics developed by the statistician and evolutionary biologist Ronald Fisher. The proper way of applying the abstract mathematics of the theorem to actual biology has been a matter of some debate, however, it is a true theorem.

It states:

"The rate of increase in fitness of any organism at any time is equal to its genetic variance in fitness at that time."

Or in more modern terminology:

"The rate of increase in the mean fitness of any organism, at any time, that is ascribable to natural selection acting through changes in gene frequencies, is exactly equal to its genetic variance in fitness at that time".

== History ==
The theorem was first formulated in Fisher's 1930 book The Genetical Theory of Natural Selection. Fisher likened it to the law of entropy in physics, stating that "It is not a little instructive that so similar a law should hold the supreme position among the biological sciences". The model of quasi-linkage equilibrium was introduced by Motoo Kimura in 1965 as an approximation in the case of weak selection and weak epistasis.

Largely as a result of Fisher's feud with the American geneticist Sewall Wright about adaptive landscapes, the theorem was widely misunderstood to mean that the average fitness of a population would always increase, even though models showed this not to be the case. In 1972, George R. Price showed that Fisher's theorem was indeed correct (and that Fisher's proof was also correct, given a typo or two), but did not find it to be of great significance. The sophistication that Price pointed out, and that had made understanding difficult, is that the theorem gives a formula for part of the change in gene frequency, and not for all of it. This is a part that can be said to be due to natural selection.

Due to confounding factors, tests of the fundamental theorem are quite rare though Bolnick in 2007 did test this effect in a natural population.
