= Evolutionary suicide =

Evolutionary adaptation that leads to extinction

Evolutionary suicide is an evolutionary phenomenon in which the process of adaptation causes the population to become extinct. It provides an alternative explanation for extinction, which is due to misadaptation rather than failure to adapt.

For example, individuals might be selected to destroy their own food (e.g. switch from eating mature plants to seedlings), and thereby deplete their food plant's population. Selection on individuals can theoretically produce adaptations that threaten the survival of the population. Much of the research on evolutionary suicide has used the mathematical modeling technique adaptive dynamics, in which genetic changes are studied together with population dynamics. This allows the model to predict how population density will change as a given so called kamikaze mutant with a certain phenotypic trait invades the population. At first, a kamikaze mutant has an advantage in reproduction, but once it spreads throughout the population, the population collapses.

Evolutionary suicide has also been referred to as Darwinian extinction, evolution to extinction and evolutionary collapse. The idea is similar in concept to the tragedy of the commons and the tendency of the rate of profit to fall, namely that they are all examples of an accumulation of individual changes leading to a collective disaster such that it negates those individual changes.

Many adaptations have apparently negative effects on population dynamics, for example infanticide by male lions, or the production of toxins by bacteria. However, empirically establishing that an extinction event was unambiguously caused by the process of adaptation is not a trivial task.

== See also ==
- Fisherian runaway
- Social trap
- The Limits to Growth
- Black robin
- Ecological traps
- Evolutionary mismatch
- Maladaptation
