= Quasi-linkage equilibrium =

Quasi-linkage equilibrium (QLE) is a mathematical approximation used in solving population genetics problems. Motoo Kimura introduced the notion to simplify a model of Fisher's fundamental theorem. QLE greatly simplifies population genetic equations whilst making the assumption of weak selection and weak epistasis. Selection under these conditions rapidly changes allele frequencies to a state where they evolve as if in linkage equilibrium. Kimura originally provided the sufficient conditions for QLE in two-locus systems, but recently several researchers have shown how QLE occurs in general multilocus systems. QLE allows theorists to approximate linkage disequilibria by simple expressions, often simple functions of allele or genotype frequencies, thereby providing solutions to highly complex problems involving selection on multiple loci or polygenic traits. QLE also plays an important role in justifying approximations in the derivation of quantitative genetic equations from mendelian principles.

== Simple Model ==
Let $X$, $Y$, $Z$ and $U$ represent the frequencies of the four possible genotypes in a haploid two-locus-two-allele model. Kimura's original model showed that

$R = \frac{XU}{YZ}$

approaches a stable state $\hat{R}$ rapidly if epistatic effects are small relative to recombination. Deviations from $\hat{R}$ will be reduced by the recombination fraction every generation.
