= Oren Harman =

American science writer (born 1973)

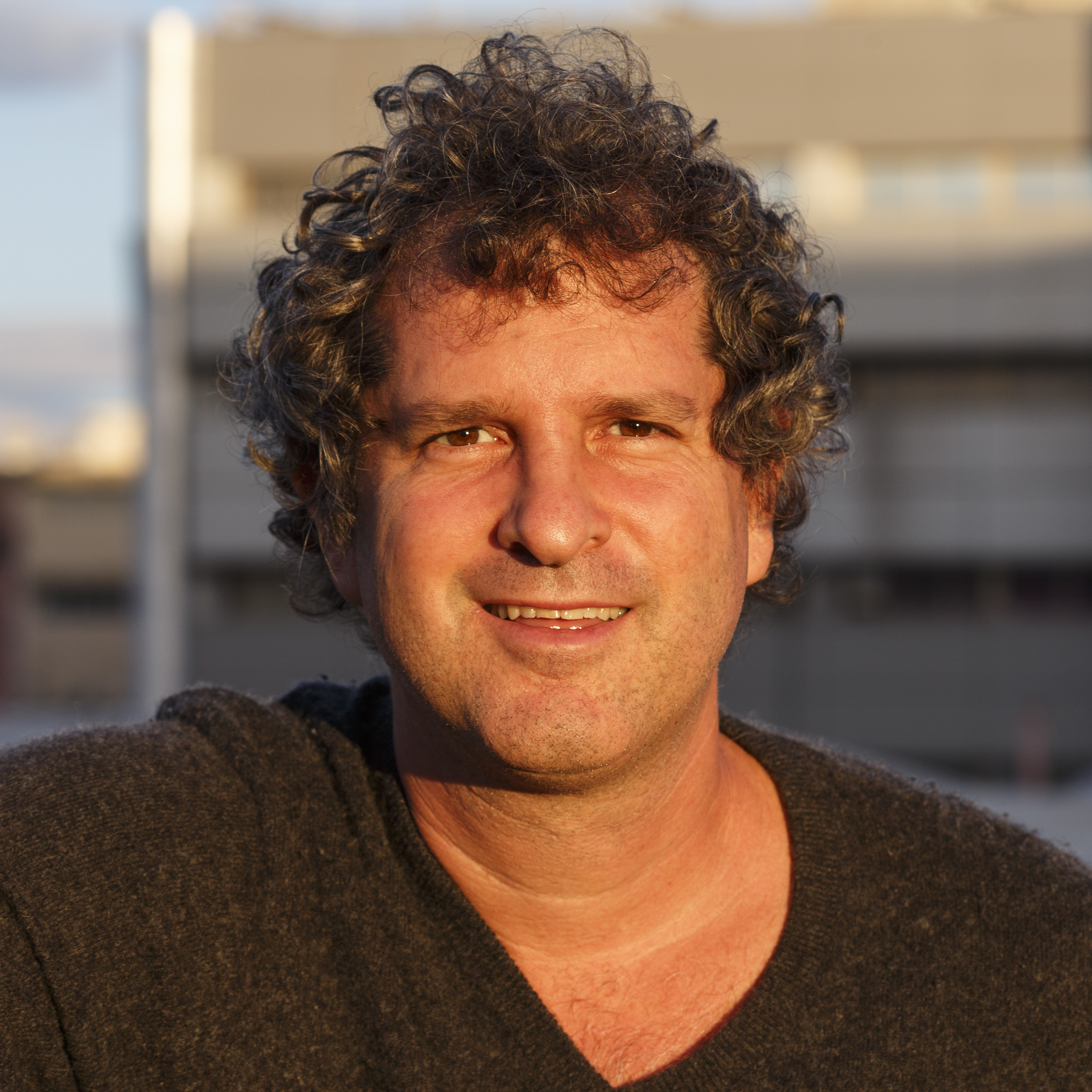
Oren Harman

Oren Harman is a writer and historian of science.

== Biography ==
Oren Harman was born in Jerusalem on January 25, 1973. He grew up and was educated in Jerusalem and in New York City, where he attended the Collegiate School for Boys and excelled at soccer (he was dubbed "the little Israeli magician" by New York Newsday). He graduated from Hebrew University Secondary School in Jerusalem. Harman studied history, biology and musicology at Hebrew University, where he graduated summa cum laude. He received M.Sc. and D.Phil. degrees with distinction from Oxford University, and was subsequently awarded the Alon Award for academic excellence, and elected in 2003 to the Young Academy of Sciences of Israel. Between 2008-2021 he served as Chair of the Graduate Program in Science, Technology and Society at Bar-Ilan University. Harman is a Senior Fellow at the Van Leer Jerusalem Institute, where he hosted the "Talking About Science in the 21st Century" public lecture series between 2018-2023, and now directs the Science and Creativity Hub. His fields of expertise include the history and philosophy of modern biology, evolutionary theory, altruism, historical biography, science and mythology, metamorphosis, and the historiography of the life sciences.

Harman has been a frequent contributor to The New Republic, and Haaretz Magazine, and is the co-creator, with Yanay Ofran and Ido Bahat, of the television documentary series "Did Herzl Really Say That?", on changing cultural identities in Israel. His work has been featured in Science, Nature, The New York Times, The Times, TLS, The New York Review of Books, The Economist, Forbes, The Huffington Post, Radio Lab, among others.

Harman lives in Jerusalem with his wife, Yael, and their three children.

== Works ==
Harman's books have been translated into many languages including Polish, Chinese, Hebrew, Japanese, Korean, Russian, Italian, Turkish, Croatian and Malayalam.

The Man Who Invented the Chromosome (Harvard University Press, 2004) tells the story of the English scientist Cyril Dean Darlington, who tried to use biology to understand human history and culture, and whose ideas foreshadowed much of the influential field of evolvability.

The Price of Altruism explores the evolutionary origins of altruism, and the life of the polymath George R. Price, who wrote an equation to help solve its apparent paradox. The book won the 2010 Los Angeles Times Book Prize in the category of Science and Technology, was long-listed for the Royal Society Winton Prize, was a New York Times Book of the Year, was nominated for the Pulitzer prize and has inspired theater plays and radio shows.

Evolutions: Fifteen Myths That Explain Our World (Farrar, Straus and Giroux, 2018) is an original rendering of major events in the history of the universe, from the Big Bang to the evolution of consciousness and the birth of humankind.

Metamorphosis: A Natural and Human History (Basic Books, 2025) was called by the developmental biologist Sean B. Carroll "A Masterful tale of the long quest to understand one of the most wondrous and enigmatic phenomenon in the animal world", and "a new classic of natural history."

Harman is the co-creator and editor, with Michael Dietrich, of a trilogy of books on the growth and development of the life sciences: Rebels (Yale, 2008), Outsiders (Chicago, 2013), and Dreamers (Chicago, 2018). He is co-editor with Dietrich and Mark Borrello of the Handbook of the Historiography of Biology.

Harman is also a children's book writer. His young adult who-done-it "Darwin's Missing Notebook" (Lama Books) was released to critical acclaim in 2024, and was chosen to the "March of Books" of the Ministry of Education for 4-6 graders nationally.

- The Man Who Invented the Chromosome. Cambridge, MA: Harvard University Press, 2004.
- Did Herzl Really Say That?! With Yanay Ofran. Director: Ido Bahat. Channel 8. 2006, 2007.
- Rebels, Mavericks and Heretics in Biology. With Michael Dietrich. New Haven, CT: Yale University Press, 2008.
- The Price of Altruism: George Price and the Search for the Origins of Kindness. New York: W.W.Norton/Bodley Head/Random House, 2010. ISBN 978-1-84792-062-1
- Outsider Scientists: Routes to Innovation in Biology. With Michael Dietrich. Chicago: University of Chicago Press. 2013
- Evolutions: Fifteen Myths That Explain Our World. New York: Farrar, Straus and Giroux. 2018
- Dreamers, Visionaries and Revolutionaries in the Life Sciences. With Michael Dietrich. Chicago: University of Chicago Press. 2018
- Handbook of the Historiography of Biology. With Michael Dietrich and Mark Borrello. Springer. 2020
- Darwin's Missing Notebooks. Lama Books. 2024
- Metamorphosis: A Natural and Human History. Basic Books. 2025
