= Maladaptation =

Trait that is characterized by being more harmful than helpful

In evolution, a maladaptation (/ˌmælˌædəpˈteɪʃən/) is a trait that is (or has become) more harmful than helpful, in contrast with an adaptation, which is more helpful than harmful. All organisms, from bacteria to humans, display maladaptive and adaptive traits. Like adaptation, maladaptation may be viewed as occurring over geological time, or within the lifetime of one individual or a group.

Maladaptation can arise when adaptations to environmental challenges have unintended harmful effects by either decreasing the current fitness of the organism or creating new risks which may decrease survivability. This could be caused by changes in trait distribution from genetic loading, exogenous environmental changes in the fitness landscape, or feedback in eco-plasticity, altering the fitness landscape.

It can also signify an adaptation that, whilst reasonable at the time, has become less and less suitable and more of a problem or hindrance in its own right, as time goes on. This is because it is possible for an adaptation to be poorly selected or become more of a dysfunction than a positive adaptation, over time.

== Examples ==
Neuroplasticity is defined as "the brain's ability to reorganize itself by forming new neural connections throughout life". Neuroplasticity is seen as an adaptation that helps humans to adapt to new stimuli, especially through motor functions in musically inclined people, as well as several other hand-eye coordination activities. An example of maladaptation in neuroplasticity within the evolution of the brain is phantom pain in individuals who have lost limbs. While the brain is exceptionally good at responding to stimuli and reorganizing itself in a new way to then later respond even better and faster in the future, it is sometimes unable to cope with the loss of a limb, even though the neurological connections are lost. According to the findings of one journal "Adaptation and Maladaptation" in some cases, the changes that had previously aided the human brain to best suit an environment could also become maladaptive. In this case, with the loss of a limb, the brain is perceiving pain, though there are no nerves or signals from the now missing limb to give the brain that perception.

== See also ==
- Black robin
- Ecological traps
- Evolutionary mismatch
- Maladaptive coping
- Evolutionary suicide
- Fisherian runaway
