= Genetic variance =

Biological concept

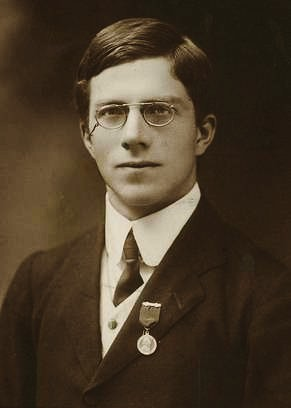
Ronald Fisher in 1913

Genetic variance is a concept outlined by the English biologist and statistician Ronald Fisher in his fundamental theorem of natural selection. In his 1930 book The Genetical Theory of Natural Selection, Fisher postulates that the rate of change of biological fitness can be calculated by the genetic variance of the fitness itself. Fisher tried to give a statistical formula about how the change of fitness in a population can be attributed to changes in the allele frequency. Fisher made no restrictive assumptions in his formula concerning fitness parameters, mate choices or the number of alleles and loci involved.

== Definition ==
Phenotypic variance, usually combines the genotype variance with the environmental variance. Genetic variance has three major components: the additive genetic variance, dominance variance, and epistatic variance.

Additive genetic variance involves the inheritance of a particular allele from your parent and this allele's independent effect on the specific phenotype, which will cause the phenotype deviation from the mean phenotype. Dominance genetic variance refers to the phenotype deviation caused by the interactions between alternative alleles that control one trait at one specific locus. Epistatic variance involves an interaction between different alleles in different loci.

== Heritability ==
Heritability refers to how much of the phenotypic variance is due to variance in genetic factors. Usually after we know the total amount of genetic variance that is responsible for a trait, we can calculate the trait heritability. Heritability can be used as an important predictor to evaluate if a population can respond to artificial or natural selection.

Broad-sense heritability, H^{2} = V_{G}/V_{P}, Involves the proportion of phenotypic variation due to the effects of additive, dominance, and epistatic variance. Narrow-sense heritability, h^{2} = V_{A}/V_{P}, refers to the proportion of phenotypic variation that is due to additive genetic values (V_{A}).

== Quantitive formula ==
The phenotypic variance (V_{P}) in a population is influenced by genetic variance (V_{G}) and environmental sources (V_{E})

V_{P} = V_{G} + V_{E}

The total amount of genetic variance can be divided into several groups, including additive variance (V_{A}), dominance variance (V_{D}), and epistatic variance (V_{I}).

V_{G} = V_{A} + V_{D} + V_{I}

== Measuring method ==
1. Traditionally, using pedigree data in humans, plants, and livestock species to estimate additive genetic variance.

2. Using a single-nucleotide polymorphisms (SNP) regression method to quantify the contribution of additive, dominance, and imprinting variance to the total genetic variance.

3. Genetic variance–covariance (G) matrices conveniently summarize the genetic relationships among a suite of traits and are a central parameter in the determination of the multivariate response to selection.

== Research examples ==
1. The distribution of genetic variance across phenotypic space and the response to selection.

Understand how empirical spectral distribution of G predicts the response to selection across phenotypic space. In particular, trait combinations that form a nearly null genetic subspace with little genetic variance respond only inconsistently to selection. They set out a framework for understanding how the empirical spectral distribution of G may differ from the random expectations that have been developed under random matrix theory (RMT). Using a data set containing a large number of gene expression traits.

2. Comparing estimates of genetic variance across different relationship models.

In this research, the researchers use the different relationship models to compare estimates of genetic variance components and the heritability. However, different models may give different estimates of genetic variances. They found that expected genetic variances usually equals the estimated variance times a statistic, Dk, and for the most typical models of relationships, Dk is close to 1, which means most of these models can be used to estimate the genetic variance.

3. Estimation of Additive, Dominance, and Imprinting Genetic Variance Using Genomic Data

The development of single-nucleotide polymorphisms (SNPs) mapping helps to explore the genetic variation of complex traits at individual loci. Researchers can quantify the contribution of additive, dominance, and imprinting variance to the total genetic variance by using a SNP regression method.
