= Evolutionary dynamics =

Modelling evolution using differential equations

Evolutionary dynamics is a branch of mathematical evolutionary biology that developed from research using differential equations to model both genetic and phenotypic change. Thus it differs from population genetics or quantitative genetics that focus on genetic change, and from population dynamics that describes change in population size over time, but does not include genetic change. The related field of evolutionary game theory was first applied to biology by John Maynard Smith and George Price. It introduced an important connection between ecology and evolution by showing the importance of frequency-dependent selection, though a flexible link to population dynamic change was still lacking.

In the 1990s, researchers began to understand the benefits of linking ecological and genetic models using differential equations, resulting in evolutionary dynamics. Some researchers consider the field to be a part of adaptive dynamics or evolutionary invasion analysis. The common feature of this work is the use of differential equations to model evolutionary change in a manner that can take into account ecological concepts as well as phenotypic and genetic change.

== Origins ==
The use of differential equations as a means of describing change over time go back to the invention of calculus by Leibniz and Newton, as well as the work of Jakob Bernoulli soon after. But the application of differential equations to biology came much later.

=== Population dynamics ===
Alfred J. Lotka and Vito Volterra developed independently the Lotka-Volterra equations, a pair of differential equations producing a simple descriptive model of the population dynamic interaction of a predator and a prey species. This took place in the early twentieth century. The model includes a parameter representing time, alongside other parameters representing the population numbers of the two species. The basic Lotka-Volterra equations can be extended to represent interactions between more species or populations, and to represent competitive interactions other than predator-prey interactions.

Changes in population numbers over time are not adequate to fully understand evolutionary change, even though evolutionary change may be taking place at the same time, since population numbers do not describe genetic details.

=== Population genetics ===
Genetics is usually thought to have originated with the experiments of Gregor Mendel, whose contributions were obscured until what is now known as Mendelian genetics were rediscovered, providing the basis for modern population genetics. Population genetics enables the mathematical modelling of discrete heritable characteristics. Although simple assumptions start with discrete changes over evolutionary time, more complicated assumptions require the solution of differential equations. Population genetics does not include ecological features such as population dynamics.

=== Quantitative genetics ===
Where the evolution of continuous heritatable traits is studied, quantitative genetics provides a means of understanding them in a mathematical manner. Like population genetics, it does not take into account population dynamics.

=== Evolutionary game theory ===
Maynard Smith and Price applied a method originally from economics to the strategy of animal conflict in 1973. This resulted in the creation of evolutionary game theory. The name stems from its many applications across evolutionary biology. An important concept of evolutionary game theory is the evolutionarily stable strategy or ESS. As Maynard Smith defined it: "An ESS is a strategy such that, if all the members of a population adopt it, then no mutant strategy could invade the population under the influence of natural selection.

Thus, evolutionary game theory provides a means of describing the outcomes of evolution through behavioural strategies, without having to consider population genetics or quantitative genetics. Taylor and Jonker (1978) showed that the dynamics of ESSs, over an evolutionary time frame, could be described through differential equations. Later, Nowak (1990) showed that certain ESSs could never be reached in evolutionary time.

These discoveries demonstrated two use cases of Evolutionary game theory:

1. The study of frequency-dependent selection of behavioural phenotypes.
2. The study of stability (ESSs) and dynamics in evolutionary time, using differential equations.

=== Linking different studies of evolution ===
The study of the dynamics of evolutionary game theory, despite the power of understanding evolutionary stable strategies, could not explain all aspects of evolutionary change at a phenotypic level. Meanwhile, the otherwise successful study of population genetics and quantitative genetics did not offer an opportunity to include population dynamics in evolutionary change. Thus, evolutionary dynamics was formulated as another link between ecology and evolution.

== Basic Model ==
A representative model of evolutionary dynamics, focused on coevolution, is explained below. This model was formulated by Dieckmann and Law (1996), drawing upon the work of other evolutionary researchers prior to them.

=== Assumptions ===
Dieckmann and Law based their work on the following assumptions:

1. Evolution needs to be considered in a coevolutionary context. This is so that evolutionary dynamics of a species (or population within a species) can be understood in relation to the dynamics of its environment. Other researchers on coevolution had identified this.
2. A mathematical model of evolution needs to be dynamical, that is, it needs to represent change over time. Although evolutionary stable strategies are important in understanding evolutionary outcomes, they raise questions about attainability and dynamics around them.
3. A model of evolutionary dynamics should include population dynamics at an individual level rather than just focusing on selection for fitness. Dieckmann and Law refer to this as: "a microscopic theory". This assumption had been verified by earlier work.
4. An evolutionary process should include stochastic elements. While population genetics and quantitative genetics have shown successful means of understanding evolution in a deterministic manner, this assumption allows the model to account for the fact that mutations arise at random at a phenotypic level. In addition, since individuals in which mutations arise are discrete, mutants may proceed to undergo sudden random extinction because of the nature of the individual in which they exist. This latter aspect of stochasticity goes back to Fisher (1958).

=== Summary equation ===
Based on their assumptions above, Dieckmann and Law proposed the following equation:

| $\frac{d}{dt}s_i = k_i(s)\cdot\frac{\partial}{\partial s_i^\prime}W_i(s_i^\prime, s)\Big| _{s_i^\prime = s_i}$ | 1 |

Equation (1) describes the rate of change over time of adaptive trait values $s_i$ in an ecological community of $i = 1, \cdots , N$ species.

$W_i(s_i^\prime, s)$ measures evolutionary fitness of individuals with trait value $s_i^\prime$ against a background of a resident population with trait values $s$. Each $k_i(s)$ is a non-negative scaling coeffcient for the rate of evolutionary change.

Equations of the general form of equation (1) were proposed prior, and relate to the concept of the fitness landscape which originated (with Sewall Wright) much earlier.

The advantage of equation (1) is that it allowed the exploration of a wide range of scenarios concerning the evolutionary dynamics of adaptive phenotypic traits, stimulating use in further applications.

== Applications ==
Many important critical points, with various evolutionary meanings, can be obtained by solving for:

| $\frac{d}{dt}s_i =0$ | 2 |

These points represent times when the evolutionary dynamics of trait values are zero. Some of these will be evolutionary stable strategies, assuming they are attainable, that is, that they possess convergence stability.

Other critical points may be similar to the saddle point of a cubic function, with evolutionary change leading past the point where the evolutionary dynamics of trait values are zero.

Lastly, critical points of evolutionary trait dynamics may be fitness minima. If these points are convergence stable, selection can occur at these points (described as disruptive selection) leading to evolutionary divergence of trait values away from the point of zero trait dynamics in multiple directions of trait space. This has been described as evolutionary branching. Evolutionary branching has been studied in order to understand speciation.

In classifying these three types of evolutionary points where evolutionary dynamics are zero, it is not possible to describe which type will occur at a given zero without setting specific parameters. Adaptive dynamics explores this property further.

This model has been used to understand a wide range of phenomena. Ferriere et al. (2002) address ecological questions surrounding the stability of mutualism using a model based on evolutionary dynamics, while Bonsall et al. (2004) applies related models to the evolution of life history trade-offs. The Red Queen hypothesis of continual evolution of species adapting against opposing species (named after the Red Queen's Race in Through the Looking-Glass) has also been demonstrated using this type of model.

Broom and Rychtář (2007) extended a game-theoretic model of kleptoparasitism (the evolution of stealing) so that it could be modelled using differential equations. This enabled them to discover new mixed strategies. Another active area of application has been the evolution of host-parasite or host-pathogen interaction.

Independently, other researchers applied the concept of evolutionary dynamics at a cellular level, in order to better understand the evolution of stem cells. Inspirations from their work may assist future medical therapies.
