= Evolutionary invasion analysis =

Mathematical modelling of phenotypic evolution

Evolutionary invasion analysis is a set of mathematical modeling techniques that use differential equations to study the long-term evolution of traits in asexually and sexually reproducing populations. It is a branch of mathematical evolutionary theory that overlaps with evolutionary dynamics and adaptive dynamics. All three fields use differential equations and sometimes produce identical results, but different researchers prefer different terms.

Evolutionary invasion analysis makes it possible to identify conditions on model parameters for which the mutant population dies out, replaces the resident population, and/or coexists with the resident population. Long-term coexistence of the two phenotypes is known as evolutionary branching. When branching occurs, the mutant establishes itself as a second resident in the environment.

Central to evolutionary invasion analysis is the mutant's invasion fitness – a mathematical expression for the long-term exponential growth rate of the mutant subpopulation when it is introduced into the resident population in small numbers. If the invasion fitness is positive (in continuous time), the mutant population can grow in the environment set by the resident phenotype. If the invasion fitness is negative, the mutant population swiftly goes extinct.

== Background ==
The basic principles of evolution via natural selection were outlined by Charles Darwin in his 1859 book, On the Origin of Species. Darwin expressed his arguments verbally, but as more has become known many attempts have been made to understand evolution in mathematical terms.

These include population genetics which models inheritance at the expense of ecological detail and quantitative genetics which incorporates quantitative traits influenced by genes at many loci.

The consideration of the impact of behavioural strategies on evolution led to evolutionary game theory which ignores genetic detail but incorporates a high degree of ecological realism, in particular that the success of any given strategy depends on the frequency at which strategies are played in the population, a concept known as frequency dependence. Even evolutionary game theory does not usually include the full understanding of ecological interactions that can be understood through modelling population dynamics.

This then leads to questions about how to understand the long-term consequences of small mutations at a phenotypic level. Linking population dynamics to evolutionary change and incorporating the fundamental idea of frequency-dependent selection from evolutionary game theory provided the basis for evolutionary dynamics, adaptive dynamics and evolutionary invasion analysis.

== Initial assumptions ==
Evolutionary invasion analysis depends on the following four assumptions about mutation and population dynamics:

1. Mutations are infrequent over time.
2. The number of individuals with the mutant trait are initially negligible in the large, established resident population.
3. Mutant phenotypes are only slightly different from the resident phenotype.
4. The resident population is at equilibrium when a new mutant arises.

Based on these assumptions the fate of mutants can be inferred from their initial growth rate when rare in the environment consisting of the resident. This rate is known as the invasion exponent when measured as the initial exponential growth rate of mutants, and as the basic reproductive number when it measures the expected total number of offspring that a mutant individual produces in a lifetime. It is sometimes called the invasion fitness of mutants.

To make use of these ideas, a mathematical model must explicitly incorporate the traits undergoing evolutionary change. The model should describe both the environment and the population dynamics given the environment, even if the variable part of the environment consists only of the current population. The invasion exponent (the expected growth rate of an initially rare mutant) can then be determined.

== Monomorphic evolution ==
A population consisting of individuals with the same trait is called monomorphic (by contrast with polymorphic). If not explicitly stated otherwise, the trait is assumed to be a real number, and $r$ and $m$ are the trait value of the monomorphic resident population and that of an invading mutant, respectively.

=== Invasion exponent and selection gradient ===
The invasion exponent $S_r(m)$ is defined as the expected growth rate of an initially rare mutant in the environment set by the resident ($r$), which means the frequency of each phenotype (trait value) whenever this suffices to infer all other aspects of the equilibrium environment, such as the demographic composition and the availability of resources. For each $r$, the invasion exponent can be thought of as the fitness landscape experienced by an initially rare mutant. The landscape changes with each successful invasion, as is the case in evolutionary game theory, but in contrast with the classical view of evolution as an optimisation process towards ever higher fitness.

As mentioned in initial assumptions above it is always assumed that the resident population is at equilibrium, and as a consequence $S_r(r) = 0$ for all $r$, otherwise the population would grow indefinitely.

The selection gradient is defined as the slope of the invasion exponent at $m=r$, $S_r'(r)$. If the sign of the selection gradient is positive (negative) mutants with slightly higher (lower) trait values may successfully invade. This follows from the linear approximation

$$S_r(m) \approx S_r(r)+ S_r'(r) (m - r)$$

which holds whenever $m \approx r$.

=== Pairwise invasibility plots ===
The invasion exponent represents the fitness landscape as experienced by a rare mutant. In a large (tending to infinite) population only mutants with trait values $m$ for which $S_r(m)$ is positive are able to successfully invade. The generic outcome of an invasion is that the mutant replaces the resident, and the fitness landscape as experienced by a rare mutant changes.

It is possible to describe the outcome of the resulting series of invasions through comparison of the success or failure of the mutant invasion through different values of the mutant trait and different values of the resident trait. Plots of these comparisons are known as pairwise invasability plots (PIPs) where the pair concerned are the mutant and resident. By convention all values of the resident trait are given on the horizontal axis and all values of the mutant trait are given on the vertical axis.

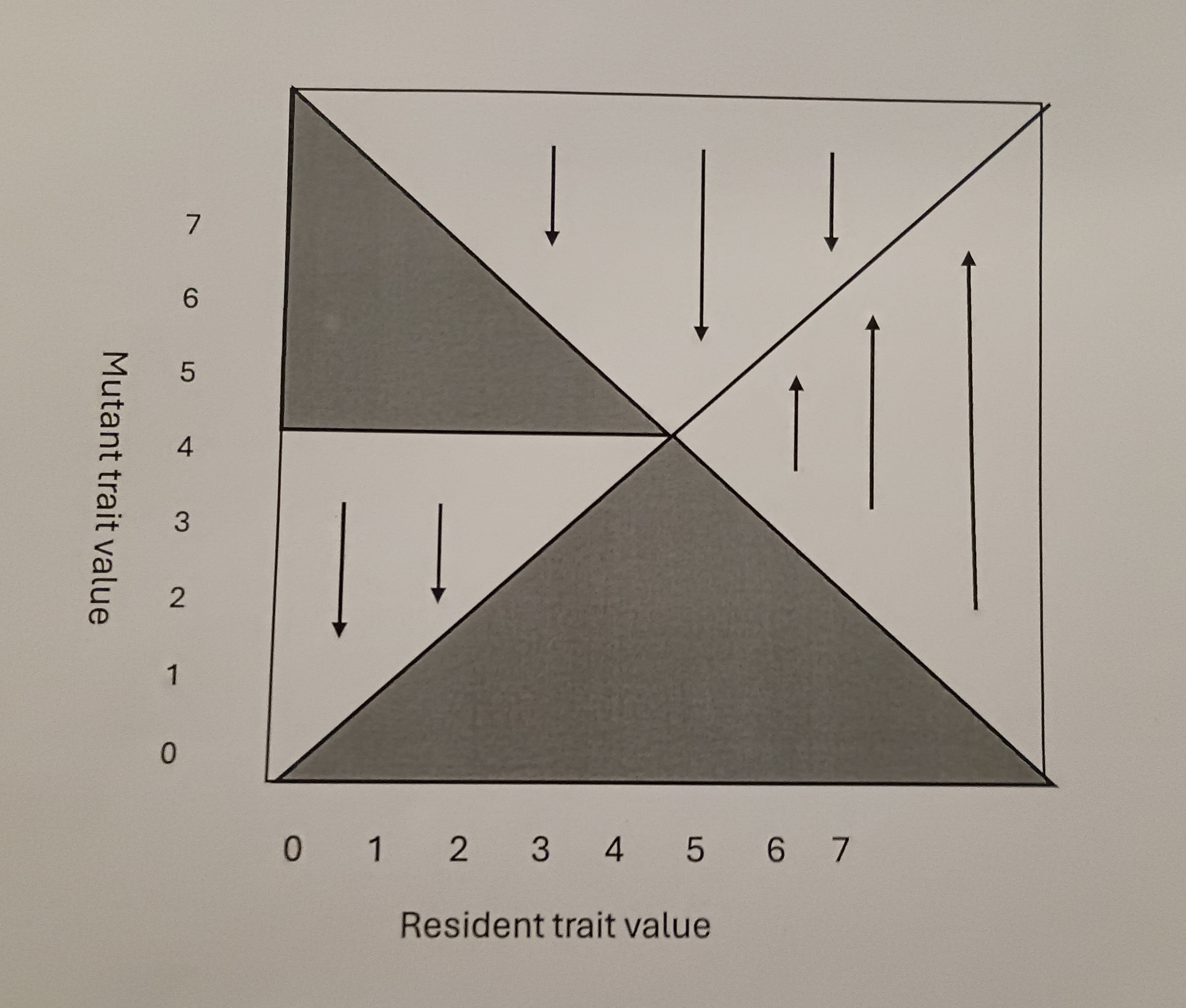
This plot shows all possible traits in a resident population and how mutants can invade

A pairwise invasability plot shows for each resident trait value $r$ all mutant trait values $m$ for which $S_r(m)$ is positive. Note that $S_r(m)$ is zero at the diagonal $m=r$. In PIPs the fitness landscapes as experienced by a rare mutant correspond to the vertical lines where the resident trait value $r$ is constant.

In the example shown above, greyed-out areas correspond to regions where the resident population is resistant to invasion by mutants, and white areas show regions where the resident population is vulnerable to invasion by mutants. Some arrows suggest directions that mutants may be driven along the selection gradient. This diagram was drawn without reference to any particular dataset so the direction of the arrows is arbitrary, except that they must all be identical in invasible areas above the diagonal and the opposite below the diagonal.

As is mentioned above: "the fitness landscapes as experienced by a rare mutant correspond to the vertical lines where the resident trait value $r$ is constant" so these arrows should be in parallel. However, since this diagram was drawn by hand and is not based on any particular dataset, some deviation may be visible. Also: "Note that $S_r(m)$ is zero at the diagonal $m=r$ " hence the arrows are drawn above and below the diagonal but do not cross it.

=== Evolutionarily singular strategies ===
The selection gradient $S_r'(r)$ determines the direction of evolutionary change. If it is positive (negative) a mutant with a slightly higher (lower) trait-value will generically invade and replace the resident. But what will happen if $S_r'(r)$ vanishes? Seemingly evolution should come to a halt at such a point. While this is a possible outcome, the general situation is more complex. Traits or strategies $r^*$ for which $S_{r^*}'(r^*)=0$, are known as evolutionarily singular strategies. Near such points the fitness landscape as experienced by a rare mutant is locally 'flat'.

Ths can occur through three qualitatively different ways.

1. First, a degenerate case similar to the saddle point of a cubic function where finite evolutionary steps lead past the local 'flatness'.
2. Second, a fitness maximum which is known as an evolutionarily stable strategy (ESS) and which, once established, cannot be invaded by nearby mutants. This corresponds to the concept originally derived by Maynard Smith and Price (1973) and which has been confirmed in many more recent evolutionary models.
3. Third, a fitness minimum where disruptive selection will occur and the population will branch into two genetic variants. This process is known as evolutionary branching.

Singular strategies can be located and classified once the selection gradient is known. To locate singular strategies, it is sufficient to find the points for which the selection gradient vanishes, i.e. to find $r^*$ such that $S'_{r^*}(r^*) = 0$. These can be classified by calculating the second derivative. If the second derivative evaluated at $r^*$ is negative (positive) the strategy represents a local fitness maximum (minimum). Hence, for an evolutionarily stable strategy $r^*$ it is necessary to satisfy the condition

$$S_{r^*}''(r^*) < 0$$

If this does not hold the strategy is evolutionarily unstable and, provided that it is also convergence stable (invading mutants successfully reach this strategy), evolutionary branching will eventually occur.

For a singular strategy $r^*$ to be convergence stable monomorphic populations with slightly lower or slightly higher trait values must be invadable by mutants with trait values closer to $r^*$. In order for this to happen the selection gradient $S_r'(r)$ in a neighbourhood of $r^*$ must be positive for $r < r^*$ and negative for $r > r^*$. This means that the slope of $S_r'(r)$ as a function of $r$ at $r^*$ is negative, or equivalently

$$\frac{d}{dr} S_r'(r)\Big| _{r=r^*} < 0.$$

The criterion for convergence stability given above can also be expressed using second derivatives of the invasion exponent, and the classification can be refined to span more than the simple cases considered here.

This classification of evolutionary singular strategies depends on the assumption described in initial assumptions above of mutant phenotypes being only slightly different from the resident phenotype. This means that evolutionary phenotypic change as a result of mutant invasion is a valid approximation to continuous change in trait space.

If mutant phenotypes are sufficiently distinct there can be discrete steps in trait space, and despite the existence of evolutionary singular strategies they may be stepped over in trait space following mutant invasion.

== Polymorphic evolution ==
Following the discussion of a population with the same trait (monomorphic evolution discussed above) it is possible to extend such models to consider evolutionary invasion analysis where multiple traits are present. This is polymorphic evolution.

The normal outcome of a successful invasion is that the mutant replaces the resident. However, other outcomes are also possible; in particular both the resident and the mutant may persist, and the population then becomes dimorphic. Assuming that a trait persists in the population if and only if its expected growth-rate when rare is positive, the condition for coexistence among two traits $r_1$ and $r_2$ is

$$S_{r_1} (r_2) > 0$$

and

$$S_{r_2} (r_1) > 0,$$

where $r_1$ and $r_2$ are often referred to as morphs. Such a pair is a protected dimorphism. The set of all protected dimorphisms is known as the region of coexistence. Graphically, the region consists of the overlapping parts when a pair-wise invasibility plot is mirrored over the diagonal

=== Invasion exponent and selection gradients in polymorphic populations ===
The invasion exponent can be generalised from monomorphic to dimorphic populations, as the expected growth rate $S_{r_1, r_2}(m)$ of a rare mutant in the environment set by the two morphs $r_1$ and $r_2$. The slope of the local fitness landscape for a mutant close to $r_1$ or $r_2$ is now given by the two selection gradients

$$S_{r_1, r_2}'(r_1)$$

and

$$S_{r_1, r_2}'(r_2)$$

In practise, it is often difficult to determine the dimorphic selection gradient and invasion exponent analytically, and one often has to resort to numerical computations.

=== Evolutionary branching ===
The emergence of protected dimorphism near singular points during the course of evolution is not unusual, but its significance depends on whether selection is stabilising or disruptive. In the latter case, the traits of the two morphs will diverge in a process often referred to as evolutionary branching. Geritz et al. (1998) present a compelling argument that disruptive selection only occurs near fitness minima. To understand this heuristically, consider a dimorphic population $r_1$ and $r_2$ near a singular point. By continuity

$$S_r(m) \approx S_{r_1,r_2}(m)$$

and, since

$$S_{r_1, r_2}(r_1) = S_{r_1, r_2}(r_2) = 0,$$

the fitness landscape for the dimorphic population must be a perturbation of that for a monomorphic resident near the singular strategy.

=== Trait evolution plots ===
Evolution after branching is illustrated using trait evolution plots. These show the region of coexistence, the direction of evolutionary change and whether points where the selection gradient vanishes are fitness maxima or minima. Evolution may well lead the dimorphic population outside the region of coexistence, in which case one morph is extinct and the population once again becomes monomorphic.

== Applications ==
Evolutionary invasion analysis, and the overlapping areas of adaptive dynamics and evolutionary dynamics combine evolutionary game theory and population dynamics. Thus, they can be useful in investigating how evolution affects population dynamics. One interesting finding to come out of this is that individual-level adaptation can sometimes result in the extinction of the whole population/species, a phenomenon known as evolutionary suicide.

Because evolutionary branching is one possible outcome at an evolutionary singular strategy, if this occurs it can be used to model speciation.

Expanding models of the invasion of mutants to consider age-structured populations allows evolutionary invasion analysis to be applied to the understanding of age-specific resistance to infectious disease. Another example of the application of evolutionary invasion analysis to structured populations is given by Willams and Kamel (2021). Here the population structure may be age-related, but it may also be stage-, space-, or structured based on other ecological assumptions.

Whether or not age-structure is considered, the population models considered above can also be modified to study the related problem of host-parasite coevolution.

But why stop at two populations? The dynamics of food webs have been of interest in ecology for a long time. Yacinne et al. (2021) took the underlying principles of the models discussed above and applied them to the understanding of the interaction of many species evolving in a food web.

Another application domain helps explain how diverse species persist in different ecological niches. Ito and Sasaki (2023) combine an ecological model for species packing with an extension of the evolutionary models discussed above showing evolutionary invasion analysis. They show geographical and evolutionary divergence by comparison to most evolutionary advanced populations. These populations lagging in evolutionary time can be described as "living fossils".
