= Weak selection =

Weak selection in evolutionary biology is when individuals with different phenotypes possess similar fitness, i.e. one phenotype is weakly preferred over the other. Weak selection, therefore, is an evolutionary theory to explain the maintenance of multiple phenotypes in a stable population.

Weak selection can only be used to explain the maintenance of mutations in a Moran process. A Moran process is one in which birth and death are paired events, and therefore population size remains constant. If the population size was increasing, both wild type and mutant phenotypes can proliferate and the weak selection for one phenotype results in no particular selection for either. Hence weak selection requires a finite population to operate. Otherwise there would be no expectation of fixation and hence no selection.

The result of weak selection is two phenotypes with similar fixation probabilities. Weak selection works to elongate fixation time for two competing alleles. Consequently, weak selection provides a model for describing how evolution can occur in large steps in a population in which multiple alleles are maintained.

There are two basic reasons that two phenotypes could have very similar fitness. One reason could be that the phenotypic differences between wild type and mutant are large but the significance of the mutation is minor. An example could be a change in pigmentation. Another reason could be that the phenotypic differences between wild type and mutant are actually small, such as tail length variation. In either case, the significance of the mutation, which is determined by the environment creating the selective pressure, is low in comparison to other mutations. Hence, almost near neutral mutations result in phenotypes that are weakly selected.

Weak selection creates a situation in which the evolutionary dynamics governing the phenotype frequencies in a population are mainly driven by random fluctuations. Hence weak selection increases the impact of stochastic processes on the evolutionary dynamics of the trait being weakly selected. For example, genetic drift could cause a nearly neutral mutation to become the dominant allele in a population by wiping out the wild type. Weak selection is therefore also especially sensitive to the effects of population size. In smaller populations, a weakly selected mutation could proliferate due to stochastic processes such as genetic drift even more easily.

Empirically, nonsynonymous substitutions have been reported to proliferate through weak selection in Drosophila melanogaster and Arabidopsis. These non-neutral mutations are thought to have special significance evolutionarily when they affect gene regulatory elements. This is because differential gene expression is critical development and therefore can potentially affect the morphology of an organism. Furthermore, weak selection operates in codon-usage bias resulting in differential levels of gene expression by altering the rate of transcription in mutants with non-preferred codons. Hence, even so called "silent" mutations can result in slight variations in the fitness of an organism. Additionally, gene duplication offers another way in which an apparently nonfunctional mutation can be maintained through weak selection. Differential expression of duplicate gene copies provides a mechanism through which a protein can evolve new functions.
