= George R. Price =

American mathematician

- Born: October 16, 1922; New York, United States
- Died: January 6, 1975 (aged 52); London, United Kingdom
- Education: University of Chicago
- Spouse: Julia Madigan (m. 1947 div. 1955)
- Scientific career
- Fields: Population genetics, physical chemistry

George Robert Price (October 16, 1922 – January 6, 1975) was an American population geneticist. Price is often noted for his formulation of the Price equation in 1967.

Originally a physical chemist and later a science journalist, he moved to London in 1967, where he worked in theoretical biology at the Galton Laboratory, making three important contributions: first, rederiving W.D. Hamilton's work on kin selection with the new Price equation that vindicated group selection; second, introducing (with John Maynard Smith) the concept of the evolutionarily stable strategy (ESS), a central concept in game theory; and third, formalizing Fisher's fundamental theorem of natural selection.

Price converted to Christianity and gave all his possessions to the poor. Struggling with a thyroid condition in conditions of great poverty, he grew increasingly depressed and committed suicide.

== Early life ==
Price was born in 1922 in the U.S. state of New York. His father, an electrician, died when Price was four. His mother was a former theater actress, and the family struggled through the Great Depression.

Price attended Birch Wathen School followed by Stuyvesant High School in New York. He graduated with a degree in chemistry from University of Chicago in 1943 and received his doctorate in the subject from the same institution in 1946.

In 1947 he married Julia Madigan, but their relationship was contentious as George was a strong atheist while his wife was a practicing Roman Catholic. They divorced in 1955, having had two daughters, Annamarie and Kathleen.

== Career ==
=== Early career ===
Price was a member of the Manhattan Project as a chemist looking into the characteristics of plutonium-235. Between 1946 and 1948, he was an instructor in chemistry at Harvard University and consultant to Argonne National Laboratory. Later, he took a position at Bell Laboratories to work on the chemistry of transistors. He then worked as a research associate in medicine at the University of Minnesota, working on, among other things, fluorescence microscopy and liver perfusion. In 1955 and 1956, he published two papers in the journal Science criticizing the pseudoscientific claims of extrasensory perception.

Continuing with science journalism, Price tried to write a book titled No Easy Way about the United States' Cold War with the Soviet Union and the People's Republic of China, but complained that "the world kept changing faster than I could write about it", and so the book was never finished.

From 1961 to 1967, Price was employed by IBM as a consultant on graphic data processing. In 1966, he was treated for thyroid cancer, but the operation to remove the tumour left his shoulder partially paralysed and left him reliant on thyroxine medication. With the money from his medical insurance, he moved to the United Kingdom to start a new life in November 1967.

=== In Britain ===
W.D. Hamilton failed to recall when Price first contacted him, but says Price had read Hamilton's 1964 papers on kin selection, and with no training in population genetics or statistics devised the Price equation, a covariance equation that generated the change in allele frequency of a population. Although the first part of the equation had previously been derived by Alan Robertson and C. C. Li, its second component allowed it to be applied to all levels of selection, meiotic drive, traditional natural selection with an extension into inclusive fitness and group selection.

=== Conversion to Christianity ===
On 6 June 1970, Price had a religious experience and became an ardent scholar of the New Testament. He believed that there had been too many coincidences in his life. In particular, he wrote a lengthy essay titled The Twelve Days of Easter, arguing that the calendar of events surrounding Jesus of Nazareth's death in Easter Week was actually slightly longer. Later he turned away from Biblical scholarship and instead dedicated his life to community work, helping the needy of North London.

=== Other work in evolutionary theory ===
Price developed a new interpretation of Fisher's fundamental theorem of natural selection, the Price equation, which has now been accepted as the best interpretation of a formerly enigmatic result. He wrote what is still widely held to be the best mathematical, biological and evolutionary representation of altruism. He also pioneered the application of game theory to evolutionary biology, in a co-authored 1973 paper with John Maynard Smith. Furthermore, Price reasoned that in the same way as an organism may sacrifice itself and further its genes (altruism) an organism may sacrifice itself to eliminate others of the same species if it enabled closely related organisms to better propagate their related genes. This negative altruism was described in a paper published by W. D. Hamilton and is termed Hamiltonian spite.

Price's 'mathematical' theory of altruism reasons that organisms are more likely to show altruism toward each other as they become more genetically similar to each other. Thus, in a species that requires two parents to reproduce, an organism is most likely to show altruistic behavior to a biological parent, full sibling, or direct offspring. The reason for this is that each of these relatives' genetic makeup contains (on average in the case of siblings) 50% of the genes that are found in the original organism. So if the original organism dies as a result of an altruistic act it can still manage to propagate its full genetic heritage as long as two or more of these close relatives are saved. Consequently, an organism is less likely to show altruistic behavior to a biological grandparent, grandchild, aunt/uncle, niece/nephew or half-sibling (each carry one-fourth of the genes found in the original organism); and even less likely to show altruism to a first cousin (carrying one-eighth of the genes found in the original organism). The theory then asserts that the further genetically removed two organisms are from each other, the less likely they are to show altruism to each other.

=== Helping the homeless ===
Price grew increasingly depressed by the implications of his equation. As part of an attempt to prove his theory right or wrong, he began showing an ever-increasing amount (in both quality and quantity) of random kindness to complete strangers. In this way, he dedicated the latter part of his life to helping the homeless, often inviting homeless people to live in his house. Sometimes, when the people in his house became a distraction, he slept in his office at the Galton Laboratory. He also gave up everything to help alcoholics; yet as he helped them steal his belongings, he increasingly fell into depression.

He was eventually evicted from his rented house owing to a construction project in the area, making him unhappy because he could no longer provide housing for the homeless. He moved to various squats in the North London area, and became depressed over Christmas, 1974.

== Death ==
Possibly due to the long-term complications of his thyroid treatment, Price died by suicide on January 6, 1975, by cutting his carotid artery with a pair of nail scissors. His body was identified by his close colleague, W.D. Hamilton.

A memorial service was held for Price in Euston. The only persons present from academia were Hamilton and Maynard Smith, the other few mourners being those who had come to know him through his community work. He is buried in St Pancras Cemetery.

== Recognition ==
Price's contributions were largely overlooked for 20 years; he had worked in theoretical biology for only a short time and was not very thorough in publishing papers. This has changed in recent years. An article by James Schwartz published in 2000 was the beginning of the historical redress. In 2010, Oren Harman's LA Times Book Prize winning biography, The Price of Altruism: George Price and the Search for the Origins of Kindness was published, and has received major attention, finally bringing Price and his story to the general public. A stage play about Price, The Altruists by Craig Baxter, won the fourth STAGE International Script Competition. On 29 March 2016, Farnworth's play Calculating Kindness opened for a sold-out three-week run at the Camden People's Theatre.

== In media ==
- The story of Price's equation, its application to altruism, and the profound effects this supposedly had on its discoverer's life were featured in an episode of Dark Matters: Twisted But True, in a segment entitled "Killed by Kindness".
- Similar coverage, both of Price's contributions to studies of altruism and his efforts to disprove the supposed selfishness of altruism, was discussed in "The Good Show" episode of the NPR series Radiolab in December 2010.
- The life and work of Price and his work with Bill Hamilton is the central theme of the third and final documentary of the series All Watched Over by Machines of Loving Grace by Adam Curtis and includes an interview with his daughter Kathleen.
- The life story of George R. Price was dramatized in 2010 by Craig Baxter, whose play The Altruists won the S.T.A.G.E. (Scientists, Technologists and Artists Generating Exploration) International Playwriting Competition in that year; and again in 2016 by Lydia Adetunji as a play titled Calculating Kindness.
- Northern Irish singer songwriter Joshua Burnside wrote about Price and his fate in his song 'George Price'.
- A 2025 episode of Tim Harford's Cautionary Tales podcast features Price.

== Legacy ==
The Papers of George R Price are housed at the British Library. The papers can be accessed through the British Library catalogue.

== Bibliography ==
- Price, G.R. (1955). "Science and the supernatural". Science. 122 (3165): 359–367. Bibcode:1955Sci...122..359P. doi:10.1126/science.122.3165.359. JSTOR 1750914. PMID 13246641.
- Price, G.R. (1956). "Where is the definitive experiment?". Science. 123 (3184): 17–18. Bibcode:1956Sci...123...17P. doi:10.1126/science.123.3184.17. JSTOR 1750107. PMID 13281471.
- Price, G.R. (1970). "Selection and covariance" (PDF). Nature. 227 (5257): 520–521. Bibcode:1970Natur.227..520P. doi:10.1038/227520a0. PMID 5428476. S2CID 4264723.
- Price, G.R. (1971). "Extension of the Hardy–Weinberg law to assortative mating". Annals of Human Genetics. 34 (4): 455–458. doi:10.1111/j.1469-1809.1971.tb00259.x. PMID 5579418. S2CID 32368574.
- Price, G.R. (1972a). "Extension of covariance selection mathematics". Annals of Human Genetics. 35 (4): 485–490. doi:10.1111/j.1469-1809.1957.tb01874.x. PMID 5073694. S2CID 37828617.
- Price, G.R.; Smith, C.A.B. (1972b). "Fisher's Malthusian parameter and reproductive value". Annals of Human Genetics. 36 (1): 1–7. doi:10.1111/j.1469-1809.1972.tb00577.x. PMID 4656765. S2CID 44809525.
- Price, G.R. (1972c). "Fisher's fundamental theorem made clear". Annals of Human Genetics. 36 (2): 129–140. doi:10.1111/j.1469-1809.1972.tb00764.x. PMID 4656569. S2CID 20757537.
- Maynard Smith, J.; Price, G.R. (1973). "The logic of animal conflict". Nature. 246 (5427): 15–18. Bibcode:1973Natur.246...15S. doi:10.1038/246015a0. S2CID 4224989.
- Price, G.R. (1995). "The nature of selection". Journal of Theoretical Biology. 175 (3): 389–396. Bibcode:1995JThBi.175..389P. doi:10.1006/jtbi.1995.0149. ISSN 0022-5193. PMID 7475082 – via DeepDyve. (written c. 1971)
- Harman, Oren. (2010). The Price of Altruism: George Price and the Search for the Origins of Kindness, Bodley Head. ISBN 978-1-84792-062-1
