= David Harper =

David or Dave Harper may refer to:

== Arts and entertainment ==
- David Harper or Edwin Corley (1931–1981), American novelist
- David M. Harper (architect) (born 1953), American architect and design/build entrepreneur
- David W. Harper (born 1961), American actor
- David Harper (antiques expert) (born 1967), British television antiques expert and writer
- David Harper (General Hospital), fictional character in the soap opera General Hospital
- David Harper (journalist) (born 1983), British journalist, and television and radio presenter

== Science and medicine ==
- David M. Harper (zoologist) (born 1950), English zoologist
- David Harper (biologist), British lecturer in evolutionary biology
- David Harper (palaeontologist) (born 1953), British palaeontologist, professor at Durham University

== Sports ==
- Dave Harper (baseball) (1917–1996), American Negro leagues baseball player
- Dave Harper (footballer) (1938–2013), English footballer
- Dave Harper (American football) (1966–2021), American football player

== Others ==
- David Harper (judge), Australian judge

== Other uses ==
- This is David Harper, a television parody show, originally called This is David Lander
