= Megaevolution =

Great changes in evolutionary history

Megaevolution is the most dramatic events in evolution. It is no longer suggested that the evolutionary processes involved are necessarily special, although in some cases they might be. Whereas macroevolution can apply to relatively modest changes that produced diversification of species and genera and are readily compared to microevolution, "megaevolution" is used for great changes. Megaevolution has been extensively debated because it has been seen as a possible objection to Charles Darwin's theory of gradual evolution by natural selection.

A list was prepared by John Maynard Smith and Eörs Szathmáry which they called The Major Transitions in Evolution. On the 1999 edition of the list they included:

1. Replicating molecules: change to populations of molecules in protocells
2. Independent replicators leading to chromosomes
3. RNA as gene and enzyme change to DNA genes and protein enzymes
4. Bacterial cells (prokaryotes) leading to cells (eukaryotes) with nuclei and organelles
5. Asexual clones leading to sexual populations
6. Single-celled organisms leading to fungi, plants and animals
7. Solitary individuals leading to colonies with non-reproducing castes (termites, ants & bees)
8. Primate societies leading to human societies with language

Some of these topics had been discussed before.

Numbers one to six on the list are events which are of huge importance, but about which we know relatively little. All occurred before (and mostly very much before) the fossil record started, or at least before the Phanerozoic eon.

Numbers seven and eight on the list are of a different kind from the first six, and have generally not been considered by the other authors. Number four is of a type which is not covered by traditional evolutionary theory, The origin of eukaryotic cells is probably due to symbiosis between prokaryotes. This is a kind of evolution which must be a rare event.

== The Cambrian radiation example ==
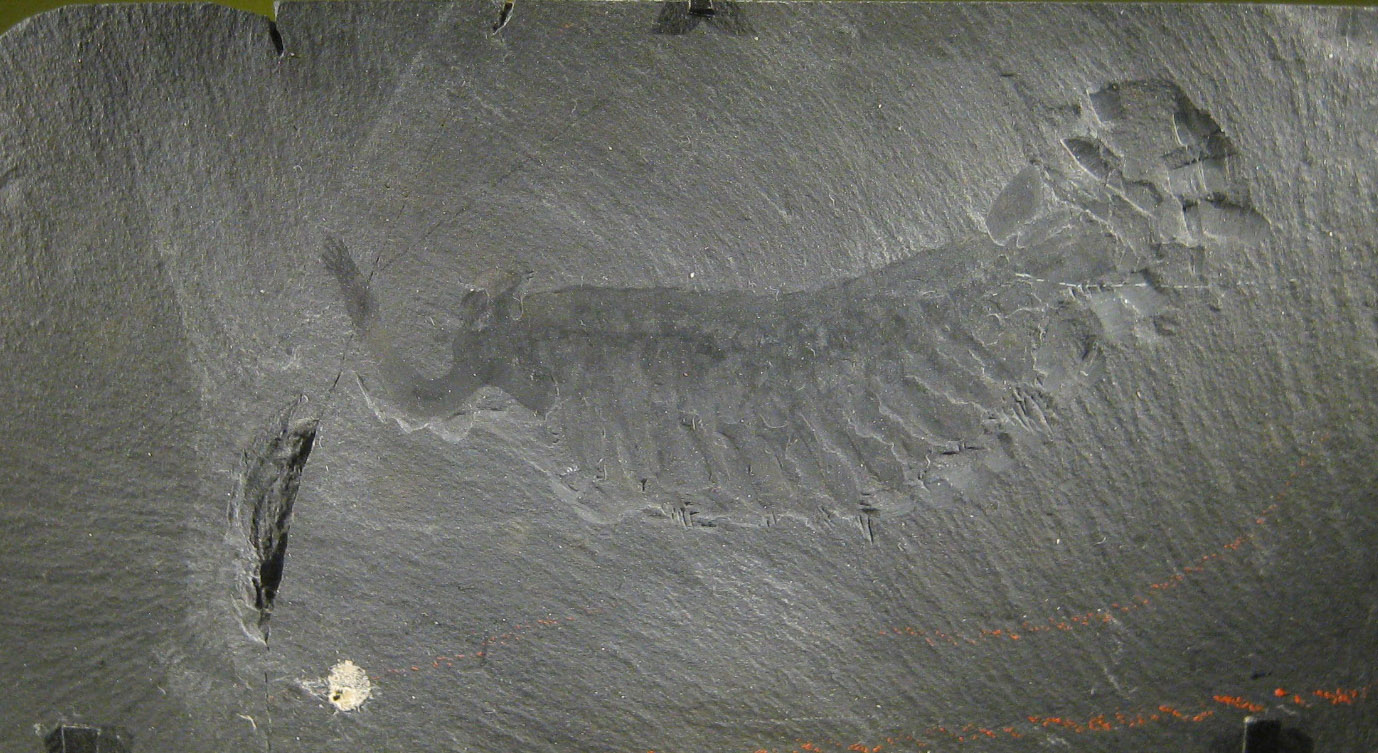
When it was first described, the Cambrian fossil Opabinia was thought to be unrelated to any known phylum. Later discoveries have shown it to be closely related to the ancestors of arthropods.

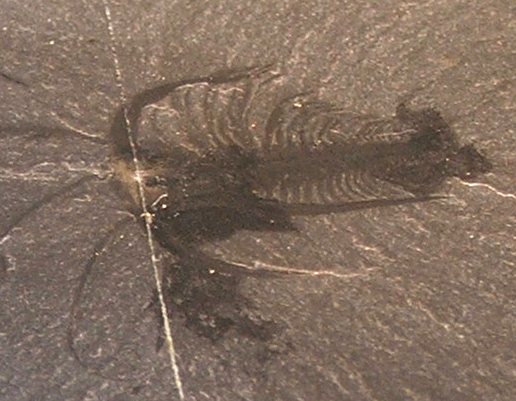
The Cambrian organism Marrella, was clearly an arthropod, but with features not seen in modern organisms.

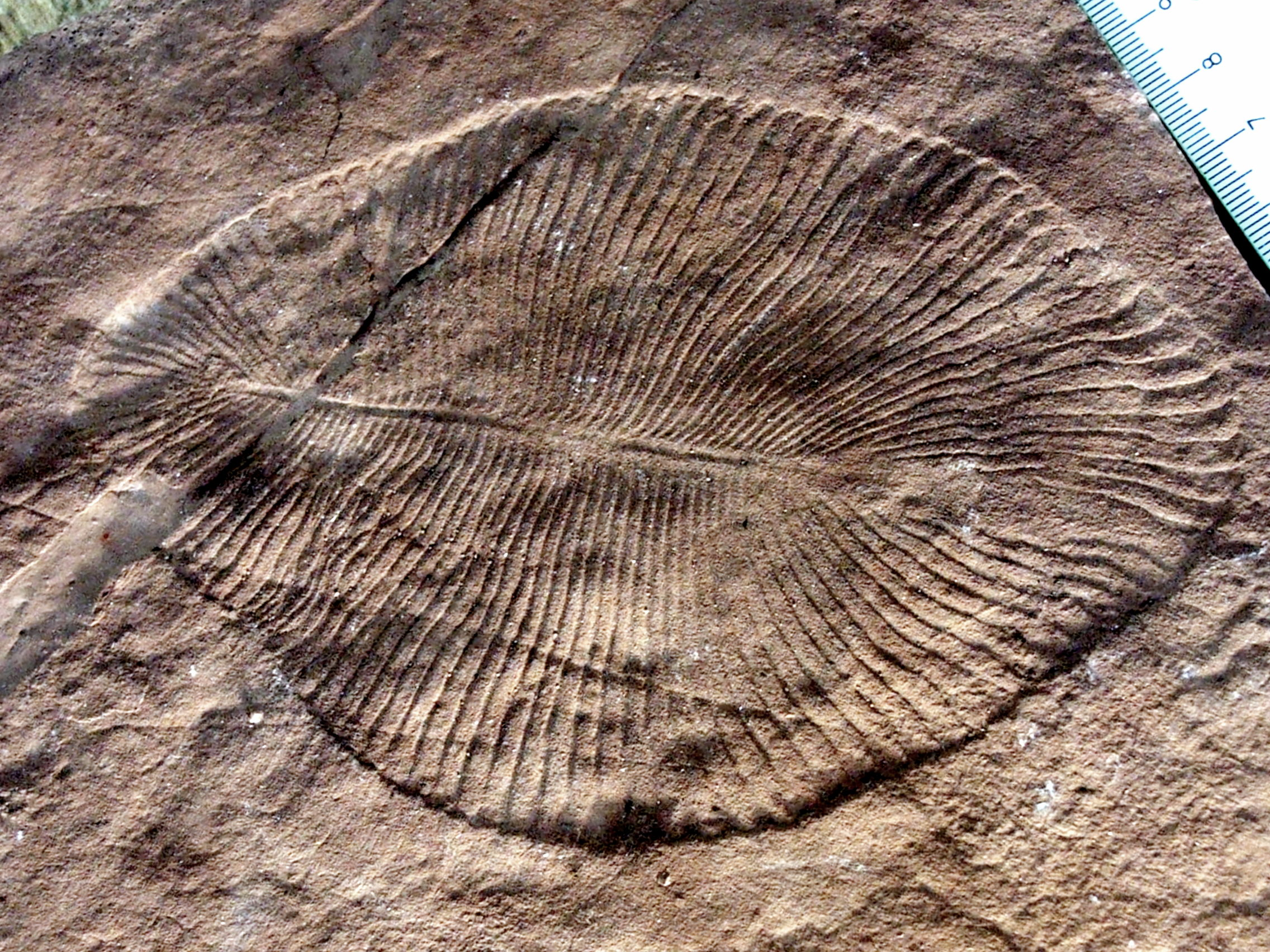
Dickinsonia, an organism of the Ediacaran Period that precedes the Cambrian, whose affinity is still unknown.

The Cambrian explosion or Cambrian radiation was the relatively rapid appearance of most major animal phyla around 530 million years ago (mya) in the fossil record, some of which are now extinct. It is the classic example of megaevolution. "The fossil record documents two mutually exclusive macroevolutionary modes separated by the transitional Ediacaran period".

Before about 580 mya it seems that most organisms were simple. They were made of individual cells occasionally organized into colonies. Over the following 70 or 80 million years the rate of evolution accelerated by an order of magnitude. Normally rates of evolution are measured by the extinction and origination rate of species, but here we can say that by the end of the Cambrian every phylum, or almost every phylum, existed.

The diversity of life began to resemble that of today.

The Cambrian explosion has caused much scientific debate. The seemingly rapid appearance of fossils in the 'primordial strata' was noted as early as the mid 19th century, and Charles Darwin saw it as one of the main objections that could be made against his theory of evolution by natural selection.

== See also ==
- Saltation (biology)
