= Ernest Lane =

Ernest Lane may refer to:

- Ernest Lane (surgeon) (1857–1926), British surgeon
- Ernest Lane (musician) (1931–2012), American blues pianist
- Ernest Preston Lane (1886–1969), American mathematician
- Ernest Frederick Cambridge Lane (1882–1958), British-South African official, private secretary of Jan Smuts
