= Sidney Maynard Smith =

British surgeon and freemason

Sidney Maynard Smith CB KStJ FRCS (20 September 1875 – 18 March 1928) was a British surgeon and freemason.

Smith was the son of W. H. Smith, a civil engineer attached to the Admiralty (not to be confused with the W. H. Smith who was First Lord of the Admiralty). He was educated at Epsom College and St Mary's Hospital Medical School, as was his older brother Percy Montague Smith (1871-1961), who was also a doctor and became FRCS.

He served during the Boer War as a surgeon. For service during the First World War, he served in the Royal Army Medical Corps and was awarded the CB by Britain and the Croix de Guerre by France; he was thrice mentioned in dispatches. He was appointed consulting surgeon to the British Fifth Army in 1916, and later consulting surgeon to the British Second Army. For his service during the war, he was appointed Knight of Grace of the Order of St John on 1 December 1916 and Companion of The Order of the Bath (Military Division) on 1 January 1918 (recommended 23 September 1917).

He became Senior Surgeon at St Mary's Hospital, London in 1922 following the retirement of Ernest Lane.

As a freemason he was Grand Deacon of the Grand Lodge of England.

In 1917, he married Isabel Mary Pitman, daughter of Frederick I. Pitman. They had a daughter Isabel Valentine Maynard Smith (born 1919), and a son, the biologist John Maynard Smith (1920-2004). In later life John Maynard Smith described his father as being "a poor boy made good" who married into "landed gentry", and recalled of their relationship prior to Sidney's death when John was eight years old "I hardly knew him; we saw him sort of Sunday lunch - literally". He and his family lived at No. 49 Wimpole Street in Westminster
