= Effects of the 1947 Fort Lauderdale hurricane in Florida =

Hurricane Four
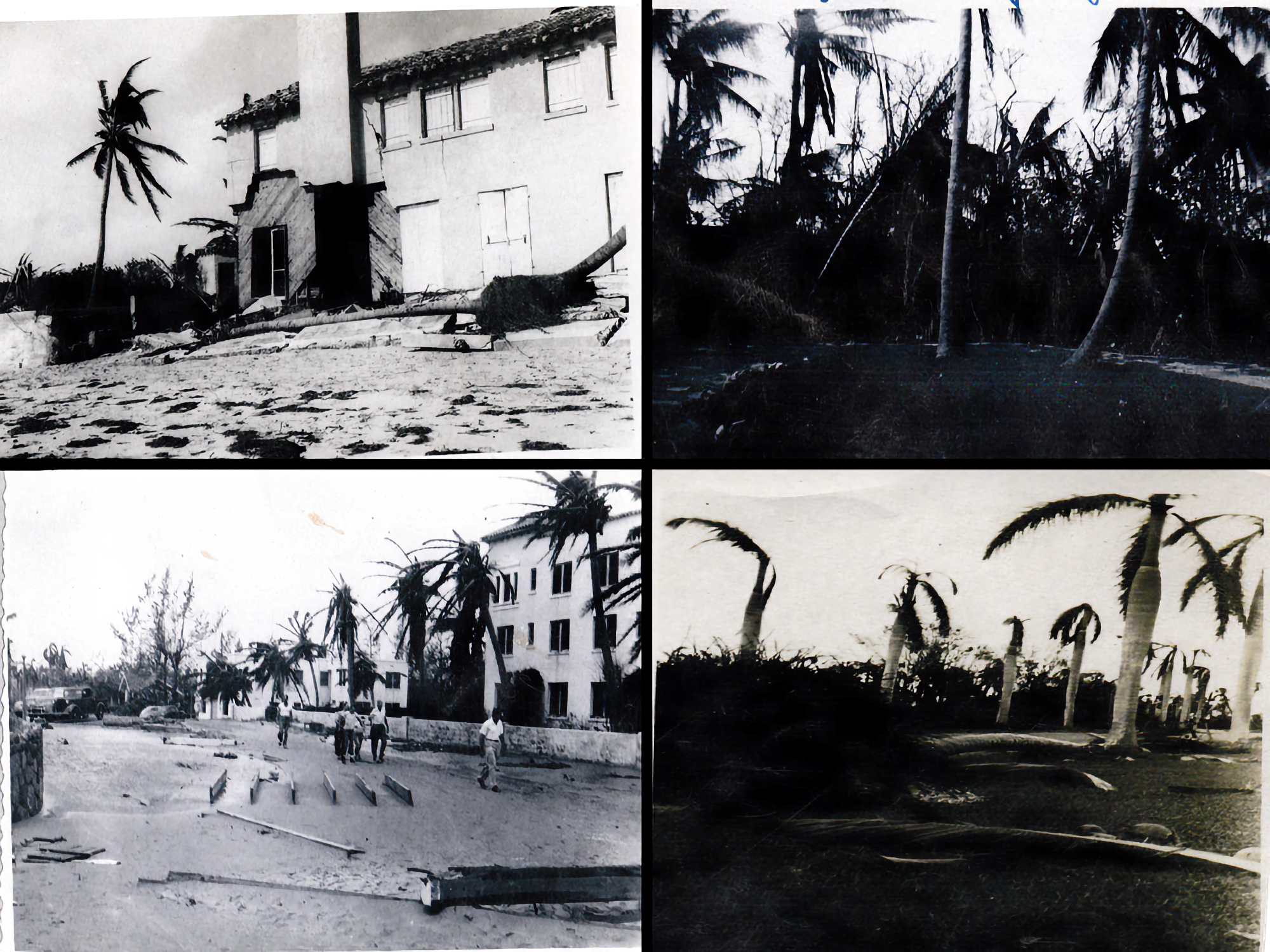
- Damage in Delray Beach, Florida

Category 4 major hurricane
- 1-minute sustained (SSHWS/NWS)
- Highest winds: 130 mph (215 km/h)
- Lowest pressure: 943 mbar (hPa); 27.85 inHg

Overall effects
- Fatalities: 11 direct, 6 indirect
- Damage: $31.8 million (1947 USD)
- Areas affected: Florida
- Part of the 1947 Atlantic hurricane season
- History: Meteorological history; Effects: The Bahamas; Florida; Other wikis: commons:Category:1947 Fort Lauderdale hurricane

The 1947 Fort Lauderdale hurricane had widespread impacts in Florida. It produced significant flooding, damage to vegetation, and beach erosion in the Miami metropolitan area. After forming off West Africa on September 2, the storm moved on a parabolic path that brought it through The Bahamas as a Category 3 hurricane on September 16, eventually striking the city of Fort Lauderdale in South Florida as a powerful Category 4 hurricane on the following day. The hurricane later crossed the state, entered the Gulf of Mexico near Naples less than 24 hours later, and went on to strike Louisiana before dissipating on September 21.

The hurricane produced heavy rainfall of up to 10.12 in (257 mm), exacerbating existing flood conditions across all of southernmost Florida. High waves pounded the southeast coast, heavily damaging beachfront structures, washing out much of the coastal highway, and piling deep sand drifts on nearby grounds. In the Everglades, many cattle were drowned and the dike on Lake Okeechobee nearly overtopped. Off the west coast, the storm caused a ship to get lost and another to sink. In all, the storm claimed 17 lives and caused $31.6 million in damage. (Note: All damage totals are in 1947 United States dollars unless otherwise noted.)

== Preparations ==
On the evening of September 15, the U.S. Weather Bureau expected the storm to recurve, precipitating a possible landfall between Jacksonville, Florida, and Savannah, Georgia. As a precautionary measure, small watercraft between Jupiter, Florida, and Cape Hatteras, North Carolina, were advised to remain in port. Early on September 16, the forecast was revised, and hurricane warnings were issued for the Florida east coast from Titusville to Fort Lauderdale, later to be expanded to Miami. As the hurricane approached Northern commercial flights were grounded, and 1,500 National Guard troops were readied for mobilization if "deemed necessary" by Florida Governor Millard Caldwell. 4,700 persons in Broward County moved into shelters established by the Red Cross, while up to 15,000 people evacuated the flood-prone Lake Okeechobee region. In all, more than 40,000 people statewide moved into shelters established by the Red Cross. Military aircraft were flown to safer locations, in some cases four days or more in advance. Hotels in the threatened area filled quickly due to fears of a disaster similar to the 1928 Okeechobee hurricane; at Melbourne and Cocoa no vacant hotels were left for evacuees. During the storm, the MacArthur, North Bay (now Kennedy), and Venetian Causeways in Miami were closed to traffic. At Lake Worth alone, 1,800 people sheltered in nine official shelters during the storm.

== Impact ==
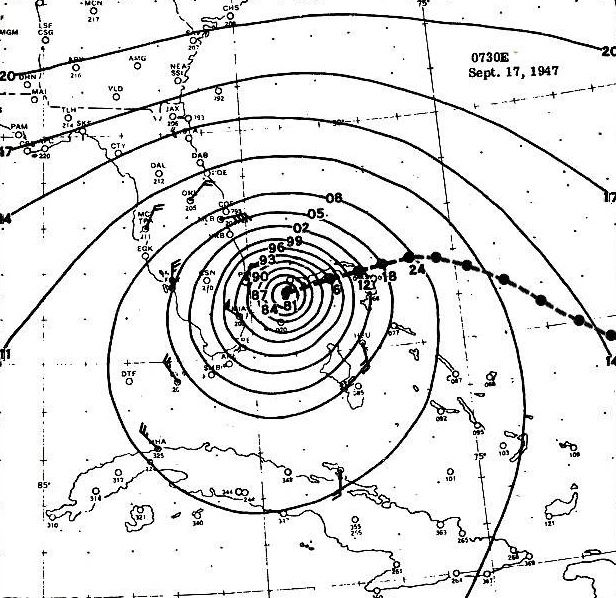
Surface analysis on September 17, showing the hurricane nearing landfall in Southern Florida

The storm killed only 17 people in Florida, many fewer than the size and intensity of the storm suggested, largely due to improved warnings and preparations, as well as more stringent construction standards, since the 1920s. Another contributing factor was the track of the storm, which, passing over Fort Lauderdale, placed the smaller communities of northern Broward and southern Palm Beach counties—Pompano Beach, Deerfield Beach, Boca Raton, Delray Beach, and the present-day sites of Coral Springs and Tamarac—rather than the major cities Fort Lauderdale and Miami, in the northern semicircle of the hurricane, where the strongest winds were likely to be found given the westward movement of the storm. The abandonment of frail concrete blocks, a staple of homes destroyed by the 1926 Miami hurricane, in favor of new layer techniques and tie-downs under the Depression-era South Florida Building Code was credited with reducing wind damage. Local radio stations also disseminated statewide weather advisories in advance, leaving residents well warned.

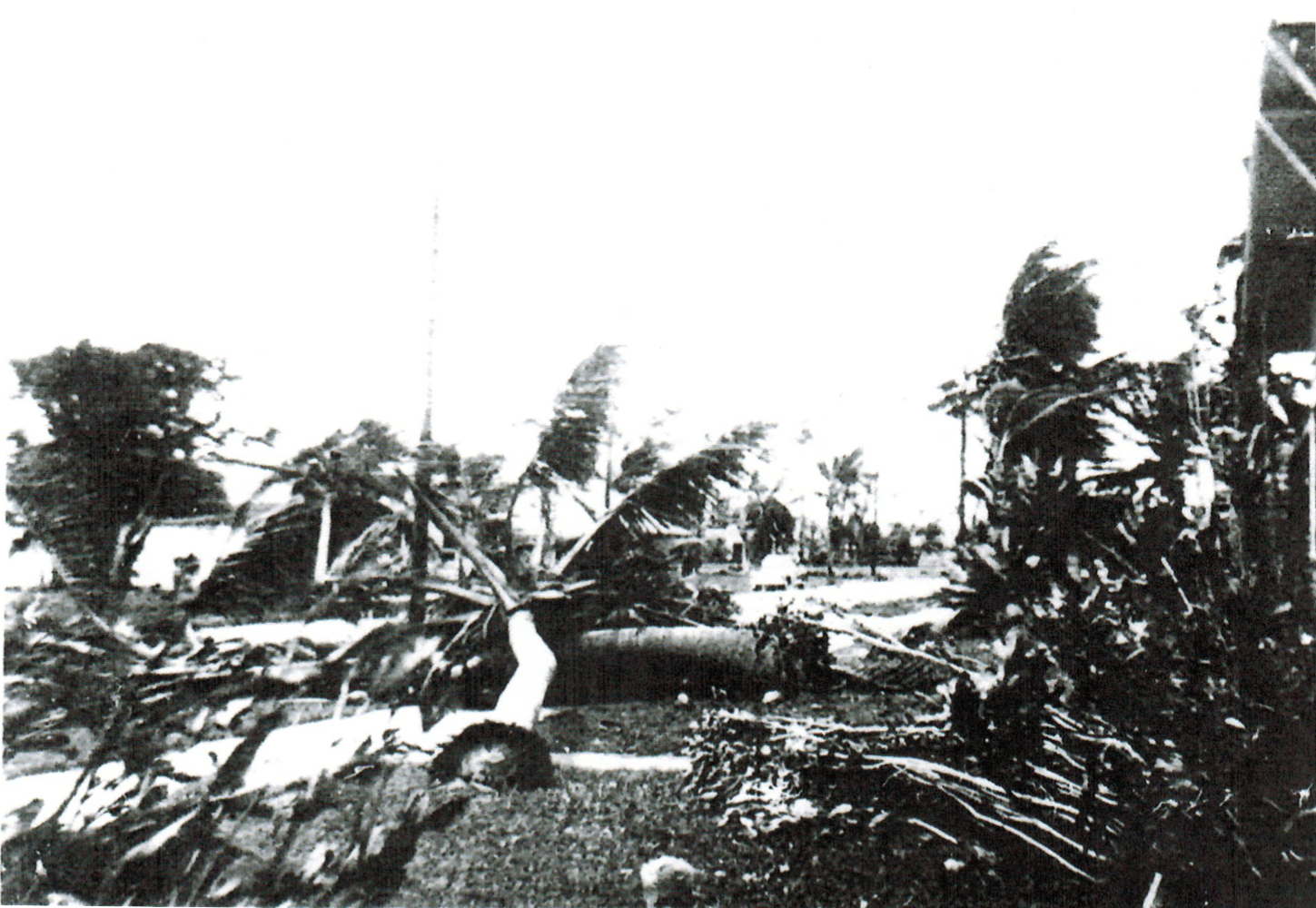
Damage at Deerfield Beach

Even so, extensive damage resulted from heavy rainfall before and during the storm. The region had been inundated by spring rains several months previous, and in July, two months before the September storm struck, the Everglades Drainage District convened a series of emergency sessions to address flooding in the saturated area. By the time the storm arrived, the entire region was saturated and partly flooded. The combined flooding from the September storm and a later hurricane in October was among the worst in southern Florida's history, even spurring the creation of the Central and Southern Florida Flood Control District along with a plan for new flood-control levees and canals.

=== Broward County ===
Upon making its first U.S. landfall, the storm produced wind gusts estimated at up to 127 mph (204 km/h) in Fort Lauderdale., The calm eye passed between Pompano Beach and Biscayne Park, lasting about an hour at Fort Lauderdale between 1630 and 1745 UTC, although estimates of the time of the lull in winds varied; one source claimed hurricane-force winds as early as 1705 UTC. The lowest barometric pressure in the Fort Lauderdale area was 950.8 mb (28.08 inHg) and was declared the official minimum pressure in the city, though not the lowest recorded in the storm over Florida. Intense wind gusts unroofed hundreds of homes and apartments in the Hollywood–Fort Lauderdale area, and reportedly "few utility poles were left standing, many having been snapped like toothpicks by the 150 mph (240 km/h) gusts." The winds blew down a large radio-transmission tower in Fort Lauderdale. Yet while Fort Lauderdale suffered the majority of losses, this was because the strongest winds affected smaller communities to the north.

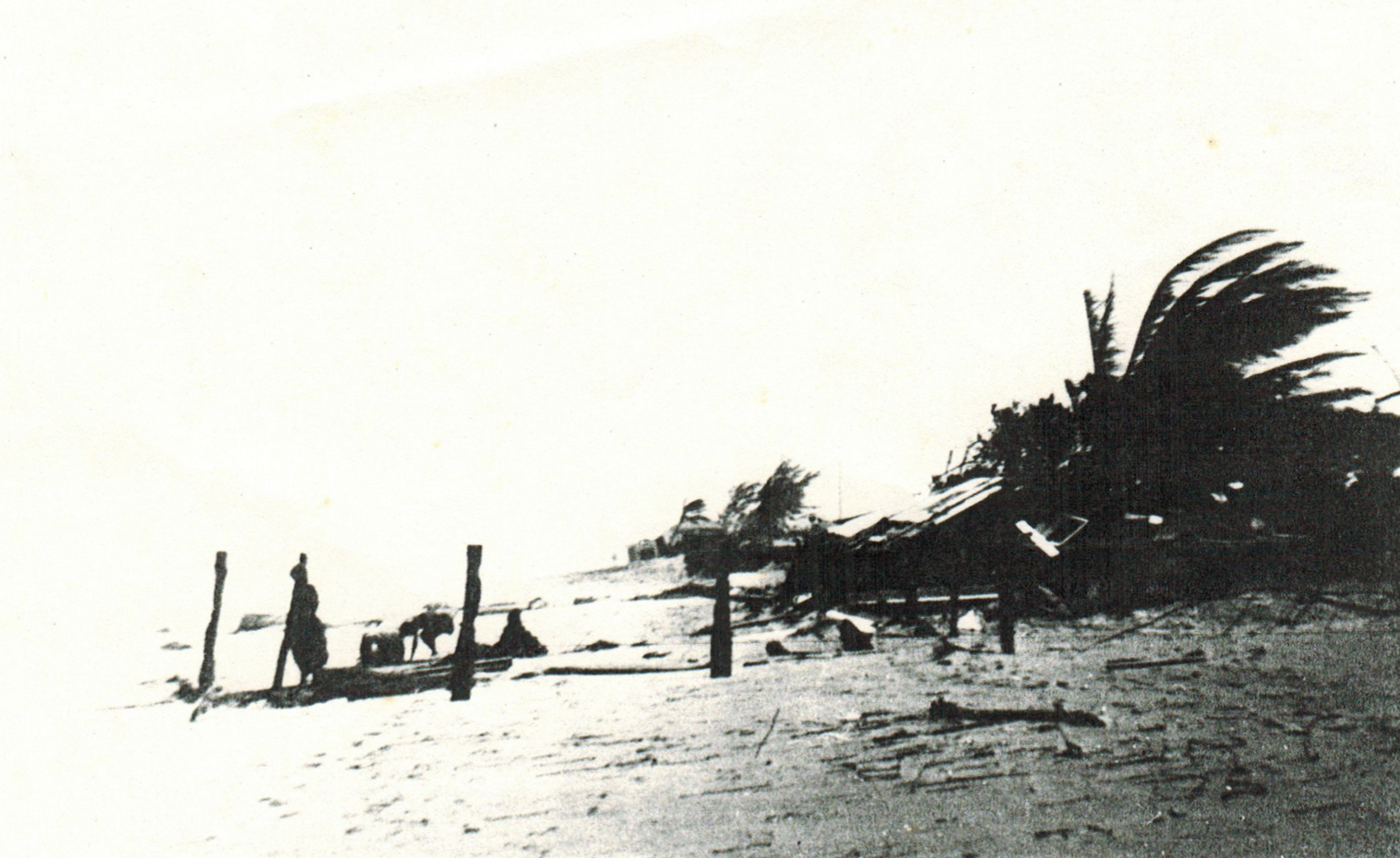
Damage at Deerfield Beach

Significant coastal flooding and beach erosion affected the county. In Fort Lauderdale, the New River overflowed its banks and submerged downtown streets, and according to the local newspaper at the time, "whitecaps broke on East Las Olas Boulevard a mile (1.6 km) inland." Tides reached 11 ft (3.4 m) at Hillsboro Inlet and along the coast from Fort Lauderdale northward. At Port Everglades, which reported 6.5-ft (2-m) tides, two freighters were unmoored; high tides carved a channel 3 ft (0.91 m) deep and rendered a nearby road impassable while nearly reopening New River Inlet, which had silted over and never re-emerged since the 1935 Yankee hurricane. High tides tore away a 150-foot-wide (45.7-m) strip of shoreline at Deerfield Beach, destroying six homes, and at Dania Beach half the oceanfront park was covered by sand. Even five days after the storm, the municipal beach at Pompano Beach was still largely flooded, with most shrubbery annihilated and leaves having been plastered by the wind to the walls of buildings; the bridge over the Hillsboro Inlet was also blocked by floodwaters.

As it crossed South Florida at about 10 mph (16 km/h), the storm dropped several inches of rain on the county, peaking at over 3 in (76 mm) west of Fort Lauderdale. The town of Davie, having lost 35,000 citrus trees to floodwaters in preceding months, suffered devastating losses to groves and vegetable beds. In all of Broward County, not a single vegetable bed remained unscathed, delaying the expected October planting season.

=== Palm Beach County ===
Although it was north of the strongest winds, West Palm Beach was battered by conditions equivalent to a Category 2 hurricane; at Morrison Field, at 1515 UTC on September 17 a three-cup anemometer measured sustained winds from the north-northeast of 100 mph (160 km/h) before losing two of its cups. In spite of the winds, wind-caused structural damage in the county was generally minor. At Lake Worth, while most buildings were materially damaged, only 10% were severely so, mostly when asphalt shingles were blown off, and few roofs suffered integral damage.

In Delray Beach, which remained outside the eye, stranded residents on the barrier island cut through downed vegetation to reach their homes. At the Boca Raton Army Air Field, the destruction of barracks during the storm forced soldiers into safer administrative and radar-training buildings. In all, on base the hurricane destroyed 150 barracks, supply houses, warehouses, the post stockade, the fire station, and the theater and mess buildings; many of the destroyed structures were frail and temporary. Losses as lately reported were 1947 US$4,500,000, hastening existing plans to close the base by November 30, 1947. At Hillsboro Beach homes suffered roof and window damage but survived; at West Palm Beach, 40% of the initial 1947 US$1,500,000 in damages was related to roof damage.

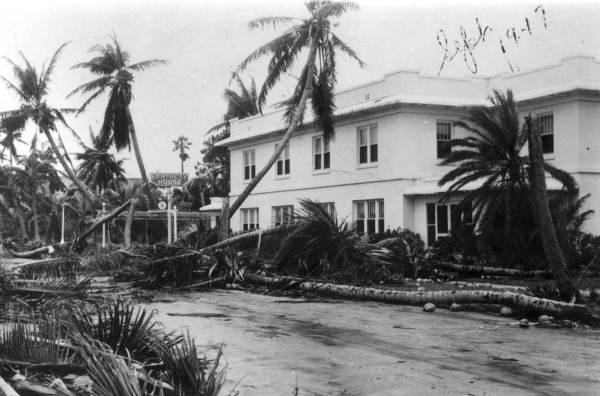
Damage to the Kentucky House in Delray Beach

Many communities reported significant tree damage. Roads in the town of Gulf Stream were nearly blocked due to fallen trees. In Delray Beach, 50% of the trees were said to have been prostrated, while the city of West Palm Beach—about 35 mi (56 km) north of the center—estimated that 30,000 of the 300,000 municipal trees in the city were ruined, in most cases having been snapped or twisted rather than uprooted. The gustiness of the winds, which, according to visual estimates in West Palm Beach, dropped to 50 mph (80 km/h) about 0030 UTC on September 18 before rising again briefly to 55 mph (89 km/h) just before 0500 UTC, was believed to have been partially responsible for the breaking of so many trees.

In the county, high tides washed out much of State Highway A1A between Palm Beach and Boynton Beach, as well as at Delray Beach and Briny Breezes. Between Sloans Curve and the Lake Worth Municipal Casino Building, 5 mi (8.0 km) of the beachfront highway were left barren, as "just an empty strip of beach...as though no road existed there." The historic casino building itself, built in 1922, was unroofed, its dance floor flooded, and itself condemned, later to be rebuilt after the storm. The tides also destroyed a famed local pavilion at Delray Beach. Many fine mansions were severely damaged, with one split in two as its foundation collapsed. In addition to high tides, the storm produced up to 7 in (180 mm) in the county at Twenty Mile Bend.

=== Dade County ===
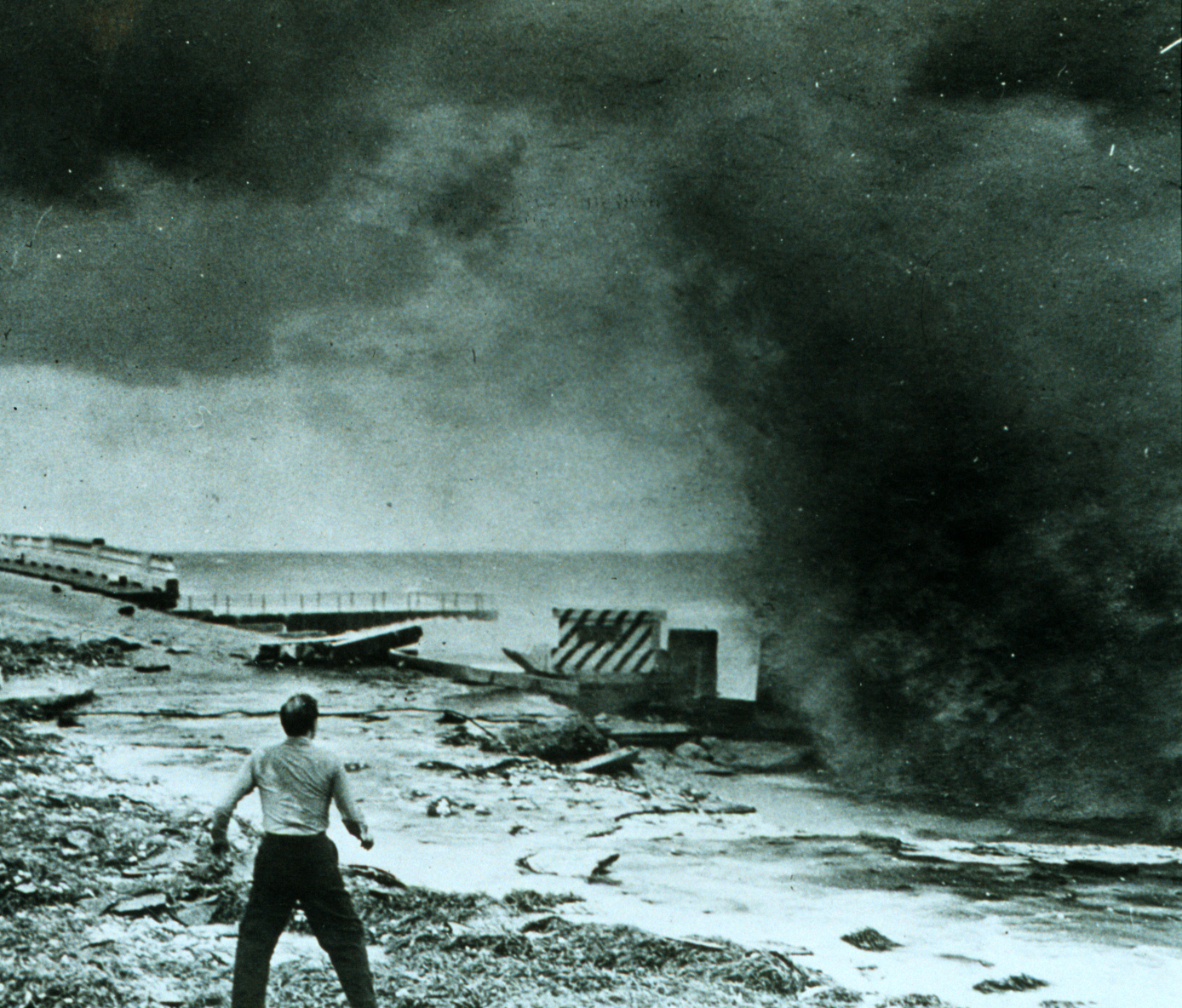
Man dwarfed by heavy surf near Miami

In northern Dade County, being south of the eye, damage was considered minimal and confined mainly to oceanfront structures, plate-glass windows, electrical lines, and vegetation, although large waves piled sand deep in oceanfront streets and tides in northern Biscayne Bay ran 6 ft (1.8 m) above normal. Strong winds unroofed the 11,000-seat Hialeah race track, damaging its barns and paddocks and leaving many of its famed flamingos missing. Miami Beach suffered the greatest losses in the county, estimated at 1947 US$4,000,000, as many of the 334 resort hotels as well as homes and apartments were battered by waves. There, a three-to-four-ft-deep (0.9-to-1.2-m) layer of sand covered many oceanfront grounds, and nearby neighborhoods on the Venetian Islands, like Belle Isle, were flooded to a depth of several feet.

In Miami after the hurricane, the city manager claimed 200 mi (320 km) of city streets were flooded out, while in Miami Springs half the homes were flooded.

=== Everglades and Lake Okeechobee ===
On Lake Okeechobee, concerns about disastrous flooding were heightened by memories of the 1928 Okeechobee hurricane on the south shore and of the 1926 Miami hurricane at Moore Haven. As of September 16, one day before the hurricane struck South Florida, the lake level was reported to be 17.16 ft (5.23 m)—already .16 ft (0.049 m) above government-mandated safe levels. At 1800 UTC on September 17, the water level between Clewiston and Lake Harbor rose within 5 ft (1.5 m) of overtopping the 31-ft-tall (9.5-m) Herbert Hoover Dike. During the storm, tides peaked at 13 ft (4.0 m) on the north shore of the lake and 21 ft (6.4 m) on the south shore at Clewiston and Moore Haven, nearly overrunning the Herbert Hoover Dike that surrounded the lake. However, due to revamped improvements in the dike, the storm caused only minor damage, and the dike prevented a repeat of the flooding of 1926 and 1928, in which over 2,500 people drowned.

Nevertheless, floodwaters in the Everglades region resulted in significant losses to cattle, and hundreds of small block homes in the agricultural districts were blown off their foundations. Much of the marshy country was waterlogged during and after the storm. Widespread rains of 6–7 in (150–180 mm) affected the Glades region of Palm Beach County. Vegetable beds were flooded in up to several feet of water, while rural canals overflowed their banks and spilled into the Everglades. After the storm, heavy rains caused one 150-ft-long (45.7-m) section of the Herbert Hoover Dike to collapse near Canal Point, leaving 700 cattle stranded and 1,800 planted acres submerged. Floodwaters submerged Conners Highway in 30 locations and swept across a 3,000-ft (914.6-m) section, combining with debris to obstruct motorists.

=== West coast and Florida Panhandle ===
On the west coast of the state, the hurricane produced sustained winds of 105 mph (169 km/h) at Naples, but the anemometer was obstructed from measuring the strongest winds. An hour later, the eye was reported as having passed overhead between 0200 and 0300 UTC, but the change in wind direction, from north to south via west, led contemporary meteorologists to conclude that the center of the eye passed just to the north, near Bonita Springs, leaving Naples in the southern semicircle of the storm. Damage in the Fort Myers–Punta Gorda area was described as being heavy, and the Coast Guard station at Sanibel Island Light was inundated by floodwaters to a depth of 3 ft (0.91 m). Tides at Everglades City peaked at 5.5 ft (1.7 m), forcing residents into attics and flooding local streets. However, the Tampa Bay area, being north of the eye, had less damage due to offshore winds forcing tides below normal. Rainfall in the region peaked at 7.36 in (187 mm) at Bonita Springs and 8.72 in (221 mm) at Fort Myers.

In Fort Myers, hundreds of trees were prostrated and the city left without power. In Saint Petersburg, citywide urban trolley service was disrupted for 15 hours due to the concurrence of the storm with a walk-out strike, but service resumed the day the storm passed into the Gulf of Mexico, in spite of debris blocking many tracks that made operations adverse. Throughout Pinellas County, an estimated 75% of the local citrus crop was lost, mainly due to bruised fruit, but otherwise overall damage in the groves was negligible, except that done to ornamental vegetation. In nearby Tampa, peak wind gusts at the Weather Bureau office were estimated at 65 mph (105 km/h) after wind instruments lost power, and the general impact in Pinellas County was minor, consisting of roofs blown from small buildings, boats damaged, roofing shingles scattered, and trees and power lines felled.

During the storm, two vessels, the schooner Pilar and the 35-ft (10.7-m) fishing vessel Virginia, with a total combined crew of nine people, went missing; as of September 18, contact had been established with the former and the crew declared safe, but the remaining vessel, with a crew of two, had not been accounted for. Additionally, six Cuban schooners carrying 150 crew members in all sheltered off Anclote Key late on September 17 and rode out the storm. However, another Cuban vessel, the Antonio Cerdedo, foundered and sank off Fort Myers with a loss of seven of her crew members.

An outer rainband of the storm produced an F3 tornado, 70 yd (64 m) wide, that struck Apalachicola at 0530 UTC on September 19, destroying 24 homes and partially damaging 31. Two people were killed, 15 were seriously injured, and 85 suffered minor injuries.

== Aftermath ==
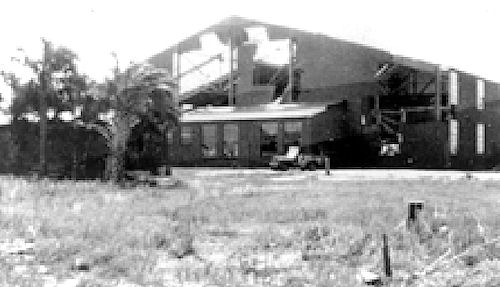
Damage to the Boca Raton Army Air Field

In the state, the storm caused 1947 US$31.8 million in damages, nearly 65% of them property- and crop-related. 205 homes were destroyed and 10,543 severely damaged. Of the 17 deaths in the state, six were indirectly attributable to the storm.

== See also ==
- List of Florida hurricanes (1900–1949)

== Bibliography ==
- Barnes, Jay (1998). Florida's Hurricane History. Chapel Hill Press. ISBN 0-8078-2443-7.
- Bush, David M., et al. (2004). Living With Florida's Atlantic Beaches. Duke University Press. ISBN 0822332892.
- Churl, Donald W., and John P. Johnson (1990). Boca Raton: A Pictorial History. The Downing Company Publishers. ISBN 0-89865-792-X.
- Colten, Craig C. (2009). Perilous Place, Powerful Storms: Hurricane Protection in Coastal Louisiana. University Press of Mississippi. ISBN 9781604733457.
- Grazulis, Thomas P. (1993). Significant Tornadoes, 1680-1991: A Chronology and Analysis of Events. Environmental Films. ISBN 978-1879362031.
- Kleinberg, Eliot (2003). Black Cloud: The Deadly Hurricane of 1928. Carroll and Graf Publishing. ISBN 0-7867-1386-0.
- Ling, Sally J. (2005). Small Town, Big Secrets: Inside the Boca Raton Army Air Field During World War II. History Press. ISBN 1-59629-006-4.
- McIver, Stuart (1983). Fort Lauderdale and Broward County: An Illustrated History. Fort Lauderdale Historical Society. ISBN 978-0897810814.
- Norcross, Bryan (2007). Hurricane Almanac: The Essential Guide to Storms Past, Present, and Future. St. Martin's Griffin. ISBN 978-0312371524.
- Will, Lawrence E. (1978). Okeechobee Hurricane and the Hoover Dike. Great Outdoors Publishing. ASIN B0006YT5ZG.
