= John Maynard Smith =

English biologist and geneticist (1920–2004)

John Maynard Smith FRS
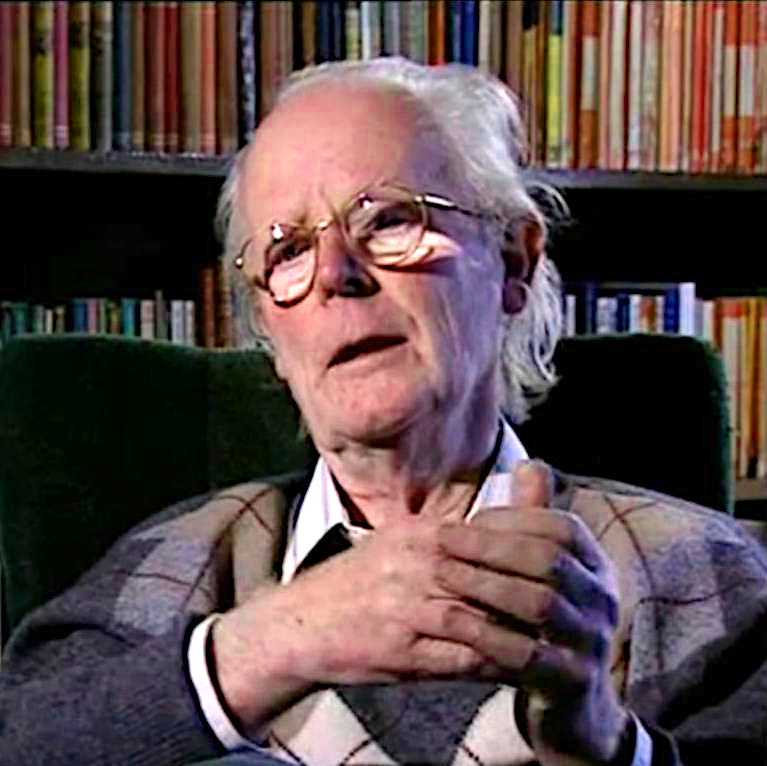
- Maynard Smith in 1997
- Born: 6 January 1920; London, England
- Died: 19 April 2004 (aged 84); Lewes, East Sussex, England
- Education: Trinity College, Cambridge; University College London
- Known for: Game theory; Evolution of sex; Signalling theory
- Father: Sidney Maynard Smith
- Awards: Mendel Medal (1985); Frink Medal (1990); Balzan Prize (1991); Sewall Wright Award (1995); Linnean Medal (1995); Royal Medal (1997); Weldon Memorial Prize (1998); Copley Medal (1999); Crafoord Prize (1999); Kyoto Prize (2001); Linnean Society of London's Darwin–Wallace Medal (2008)
- Scientific career
- Fields: Evolutionary biology; genetics
- Workplaces: University College London; University of Sussex
- Doctoral advisor: J. B. S. Haldane
- Doctoral students: Sean Nee

John Maynard Smith (6 January 1920 – 19 April 2004) was a British theoretical and mathematical evolutionary biologist and geneticist. Originally an aeronautical engineer during the Second World War, he took a second degree in genetics under the biologist J. B. S. Haldane. Maynard Smith was instrumental in the application of game theory to evolution with George R. Price, and theorised on other problems such as the evolution of sex and signalling theory.

== Biography ==
=== Early years ===
John Maynard Smith was born on 6 January 1920 in London, the son of the surgeon Sidney Maynard Smith. Following his father's death in 1928, the family moved to Exmoor, where he became interested in natural history. Quite unhappy with the lack of formal science education at Eton College, Maynard Smith took it upon himself to develop an interest in Darwinian evolutionary theory and mathematics, after having read the work of old Etonian J. B. S. Haldane, whose books were in the school's library despite the bad reputation Haldane had at Eton for his communism. He became an atheist at age 14.

On leaving school, Maynard Smith joined the Communist Party of Great Britain and started studying engineering at Trinity College, Cambridge. When the Second World War broke out in 1939, he defied his party's line and volunteered for service. He was rejected, however, because of poor eyesight and was told to finish his engineering degree, which he did in 1941. He later quipped that "under the circumstances, my poor eyesight was a selective advantage—it stopped me getting shot". The year of his graduation, he married Sheila Matthew, and they later had two sons and one daughter (Tony, Carol, and Julian). Between 1942 and 1947, he applied his degree to military aircraft and he worked as an aircraft stressman at factories in Coventry and Reading.

=== Second degree ===
Maynard Smith, having decided that aircraft were "noisy and old-fashioned", then took a change of career, entering University College London to study fruit fly genetics under Haldane. After graduating he became a lecturer in zoology at his alma mater between 1952 and 1965, where he directed the Drosophila lab and conducted research on population genetics. He published a popular Penguin book, The Theory of Evolution, in 1958 (with subsequent editions in 1966, 1975, 1993).

He became gradually less attracted to communism and became a less active member, finally leaving the party in 1956 like many other intellectuals, after the Soviet Union brutally suppressed the Hungarian Revolution (Haldane had left the party in 1950 after becoming similarly disillusioned). He also admitted that a research program in evolutionary biology explicitly informed by Marxism seemed to bear little fruit.

=== University of Sussex ===
In 1962 he was one of the founding members of the University of Sussex and was a dean between 1965 and 1985. He subsequently became a professor emeritus. Prior to his death the building housing much of life sciences at Sussex was renamed the John Maynard Smith Building in his honour.

=== Evolution and the Theory of Games ===
In 1973 Maynard Smith formalised a central concept in evolutionary game theory called the evolutionarily stable strategy (ESS), based on a verbal argument by George R. Price. This area of research culminated in his 1982 book Evolution and the Theory of Games. The Hawk-Dove game is arguably his single most influential game theoretical model.

He was elected a Fellow of the Royal Society in 1977. In 1986 he was awarded the Darwin Medal.

=== Evolution of sex and other major transitions in evolution ===
Maynard Smith published a book titled The Evolution of Sex which explored in mathematical terms, the notion of the "two-fold cost of sex". During the late 1980s he also became interested in evolutionary transitions in individuality (ETIs) and worked with the evolutionary biologist Eörs Szathmáry. Together they wrote an influential 1995 book The Major Transitions in Evolution, a seminal work which continues to contribute to ongoing issues in evolutionary biology. A popular science version of the book, The Origins of Life: From the birth of life to the origin of language, was published in 1999.

In 1991 he was awarded the Balzan Prize for genetics and evolution "for his powerful analysis of evolutionary theory and of the role of sexual reproduction as a critical factor in evolution and in the survival of species; for his mathematical models applying the theory of games to evolutionary problems" (motivation of the Balzan General Prize Committee). In 1995 he was awarded the Linnean Medal by the Linnean Society and in 1999 he was awarded the Crafoord Prize jointly with Ernst Mayr and George C. Williams. In 2001 he was awarded the Kyoto Prize.

In his honour the European Society for Evolutionary Biology has an award for extraordinary young evolutionary biology researchers named The John Maynard Smith Prize.

=== Animal Signals ===
His final book, Animal Signals, co-authored with David Harper, on signalling theory was published in 2003.

=== Death ===
He died on 19 April 2004 sitting in a chair at home, surrounded by books. He was survived by his wife Sheila and their children.

=== Controversy ===
Another evolutionary biologist, William Donald Hamilton, harboured a grievance against Maynard Smith for his handling of an article that Hamilton submitted to The Journal of Theoretical Biology in 1963, which was eventually published as two papers in July 1964. Maynard Smith acted as a reviewer of the paper after two other reviewers had been unable to understand it, and requested that Hamilton revise it into two parts due to concerns about its accessibility, later describing it as "deeply obscure". In March 1964, Maynard Smith published the article "Group Selection and Kin selection" in Nature, which covered concepts from Hamilton's article. Although Maynard Smith cited an earlier paper by Hamilton published in The American Naturalist, Hamilton felt Maynard Smith had not given him sufficient credit. Hamilton also objected to an anecdote included by Maynard Smith in a review published in the New Scientist in 1976 which implied Maynard Smith's mentor Haldane had understood the concept of Hamilton's inclusive fitness in the 1950s. Hamilton replied to the review suggesting that the anecdote was false, but later apologised to Maynard Smith for having doubted it.

== Legacy ==
The John Maynard Smith Archive is housed at the British Library (Add MS 86569-86840). The papers can be accessed through the British Library catalogue.

Richard Dawkins dedicated The Ancestor's Tale (2004) to Maynard Smith: “He saw a draft and graciously accepted the dedication, which now, sadly, must become In Memoriam.”

== Awards and fellowships ==
- Fellow, Royal Society (1977)
- Member, American Academy of Arts and Sciences (1977)
- Member, American Philosophical Society (1980)
- Member, United States National Academy of Sciences (1982)
- Darwin Medal (1986)
- Frink Medal (1990)
- Balzan Prize (1991)
- Linnean Medal (1995)
- Royal Medal (1997)
- Crafoord Prize (1999)
- Copley Medal (1999)
- Kyoto Prize (2001)
- Darwin–Wallace Award (2008). This used to be bestowed every 50 years by the Linnean Society of London; Maynard Smith was one of thirteen co-recipients, and one of only two recipients ever awarded post-mortem. Since 2010, the medal has been awarded annually.

== Publications ==
- Maynard Smith, J. (1958). The Theory of Evolution. London, Penguin Books. ISBN 0-14-020433-4
  - 1993 edn ISBN 0-521-45128-0
- Maynard Smith, J. (1968) Mathematical Ideas in Biology. Cambridge University Press. ISBN 0-521-07335-9
- Maynard Smith, J. (1972) On Evolution. Edinburgh University Press. ISBN 0-85224-223-9
- Maynard Smith, J.; Price, G.R. (1973). "The logic of animal conflict". Nature. 246 (5427): 15–18. Bibcode:1973Natur.246...15S. doi:10.1038/246015a0. S2CID 4224989.
- Maynard Smith, J. (1974b) Models in Ecology. Cambridge University Press. ISBN 0-521-20262-0
- Maynard Smith, J. (1978d) The Evolution of Sex. Cambridge University Press. ISBN 0-521-29302-2
- Maynard Smith, J. (ed.) (1981d) Evolution Now. London, Macmillan. ISBN 0-7167-1426-4
- Maynard Smith, J. (1982d) Evolution and the Theory of Games. Cambridge University Press. ISBN 0-521-28884-3
- Maynard Smith, J. (1986b) The Problems of Biology. Oxford: Oxford University Press. ISBN 0-19-289198-7
- Maynard Smith, J. (1988a) Did Darwin Get it Right?: Essays on Games, Sex and Evolution. London, Chapman & Hall. ISBN 0-412-03821-8
- Maynard Smith, J. (1989a) Evolutionary Genetics. Oxford: Oxford University Press. ISBN 0-19-850231-1
- Maynard Smith, J. and Szathmáry, E. (1997) The Major Transitions in Evolution. New York: Oxford University Press. ISBN 0-19-850294-X
- Maynard Smith, J. and Szathmáry, E. (1999) The Origins of Life: From the Birth of Life to the Origin of Language. Oxford: Oxford University Press. ISBN 0-19-286209-X
- Maynard Smith, J. and Harper, D. (2003) Animal Signals. Oxford University Press. ISBN 0-19-852685-7
