= Sean Nee =

- Born: 3 July 1959 (age 66)
- Known for: Evolutionary biology Theoretical ecology

Sean Nee (born 3 July 1959) is an evolutionary biologist and theoretical ecologist. He has been a lecturer at Oxford University and Professor at the University of Edinburgh. He has published scientific research papers with ecologist Robert May, theoretical biologist John Maynard Smith and epidemiologist and novelist Sunetra Gupta.

== Selected publications ==
- Nee, Sean; May, Robert M. (1997). "Extinction and the loss of evolutionary history". Science. 278 (5338): 692–4. Bibcode:1997Sci...278..692N. doi:10.1126/science.278.5338.692. PMID 9381180.
- Recker, M.; Pybus, O. G.; Nee, S.; Gupta, S. (2007). "The generation of influenza outbreaks by a network of host immune responses against a limited set of antigenic types". Proceedings of the National Academy of Sciences. 104 (18): 7711–6. Bibcode:2007PNAS..104.7711R. doi:10.1073/pnas.0702154104. PMC 1855915. PMID 17460037.
- Nee, Sean (2004). "Professor John Maynard Smith 1920–2004". Trends in Ecology & Evolution. 19 (7): 345–6. doi:10.1016/j.tree.2004.05.007. PMID 16701281.
- Nee, Sean (2004). "More than meets the eye". Nature. 429 (6994): 804–5. Bibcode:2004Natur.429..804N. doi:10.1038/429804a. PMID 15215837. S2CID 1699973.
- Stone, G. N.; Nee, S.; Felsenstein, J. (2011). "Controlling for non-independence in comparative analysis of patterns across populations within species". Philosophical Transactions of the Royal Society B: Biological Sciences. 366 (1569): 1410–24. doi:10.1098/rstb.2010.0311. PMC 3081573. PMID 21444315.
