= The Theory of Evolution =

1958 book by John Maynard Smith

- Author: Maynard Smith, John
- Language: English
- Subject: Evolutionary biology
- Genre: Science
- Publisher: Penguin Books (1958 edition), Cambridge University Press (1993 edition)
- Publication date: 1958, 1993
- Publication place: United Kingdom
- Media type: Hardcover, Paperback
- ISBN: 0-14-020433-4 (1958 edition), ISBN 0-521-45128-0 (1993 edition)
- OCLC: 2098708
- Dewey Decimal: 575.01/6
- LC Class: QH366.2 .M392 1975

The Theory of Evolution is a book by English evolutionary biologist and geneticist John Maynard Smith, originally published in 1958 in time for 150th anniversary of the birth of Charles Darwin and the centenary of the publication of The Origin of Species the following year. It serves as a general introduction to the eponymous subject, intended to be accessible to those with little technical knowledge of the area. It has been highly successful, considered by many as the definitive publication of its type. The original version was updated several times, and a Canto edition, with a foreword by Richard Dawkins, and newly written introduction by the author, was published in 1996.
