= The Major Transitions in Evolution =

1995 book by John Maynard Smith and Eörs Szathmáry

- Author: John Maynard Smith; Eörs Szathmáry
- Language: English
- Genre: Non-fiction
- Publisher: Oxford University Press
- Publication date: 1995
- ISBN: 978-0-716-74525-9

The Major Transitions in Evolution is a book written by John Maynard Smith and Eörs Szathmáry (Oxford University Press, 1995).

Maynard Smith and Szathmary authored a review article in Nature.

Maynard Smith and Szathmáry identified several properties common to the transitions:

1. Smaller entities have often come about together to form larger entities, e.g. chromosomes, eukaryotes, sex multicellular colonies.
2. Smaller entities often become differentiated as part of a larger entity, e.g. DNA-protein, organelles, anisogamy, tissues, castes
3. The smaller entities are often unable to replicate in the absence of the larger entity, e.g. DNA, chromosomes, organelles, tissues, castes.
4. The smaller entities can sometimes disrupt the development of the larger entity, e.g. meiotic drive (selfish non-Mendelian genes), parthenogenesis, cancers, coup d'états.
5. New ways of transmitting information have arisen, e.g. DNA-protein, cell heredity, epigenesis, universal grammar.

As stated by the authors, this book was aimed at professional biologists and assumes considerable prior knowledge. They have also published a summary of their arguments in Nature as well as a presentation of their ideas for a general readership under the title The Origins of Life — From the Birth of Life to the Origins of Language. Two decades later, Eörs Szathmáry published an "update" of his thesis in the original book, and this update involved demoting sex from a major transition as well as promoting new transitions, such as the origins of plastids, to the list. The major transitions generally involve the formation of new levels of units of selection, consisting of ensembles of pre-existing entities. Therefore, the evolution of the major transitions can also be seen as the framework for studying the evolution of the levels of complexity in biology.

Transitions described in the book
Transition from:	Transition to:	Notes
Replicating molecules	"Populations" of molecules in compartments	Can't observe
Independent replicators (probably RNA)	Chromosomes	RNA world hypothesis
RNA as both genes and enzymes	DNA as genes; proteins as enzymes	
Prokaryotes	Eukaryotes	Can observe
Asexual clones	Sexual populations	Evolution of sex
Protists	Multicellular organisms — animals, plants, fungi	Evolution of multicellularity
Solitary individuals	Colonies with non-reproductive castes	Evolution of eusociality
Primate societies	Human societies with language, enabling memes	Sociocultural evolution

Their work has generated substantial interest and further research into major transitions, including a devoted issue of papers to the subject in 2016 in the journal Philosophical Transactions of the Royal Society B. Additional suggestions to the transitions concept include the inclusion of viruses as playing a role as major catalysts for evolutionary transitions in two ways. One, parasite-host arms race often leads to the formation of complex structures and levels of complexity to combat the threat of viruses. Two, gene transfer from viruses and virus-like elements may contribute important genes for the emergence of higher levels of organization. Others have noted that the concept of transitions in macroevolutionary history focuses on increases in the levels of complexity, whereas macroevolutionary events can also proceed through simplifications which undo these hierarchical increases in complexity (e.g. multicellular organisms losing adherence genes and so transitioning into unicellular organisms, or the animal and plant lineages with degenerated organelles such as mitosomes). Furthermore, simplifications can also enable other macroevolutionary complexifications (e.g. the bacterial endosymbiont that simplified into the integrated mitochondrial organelle). Thus, incorporating simplification dynamics will help further elucidate the emergence of life's lineages. On the other hand, Szathmáry pointed out the theory of phase transitions as a potentially useful framework for defining and characterizing major transitions. This framework has proved fruitful in some cases, such as the transition from prokaryotic to eukaryotic genome, identified as an algorithmic phase transition in the functioning of genes.

== See also ==
- History of life
- Evolutionary transition in individuality
- Symbiogenesis
- Metasystem transition, a related notion developed by Valentin Turchin in 1977.
- Origin of life
- Great Filter
