= David Harper (journalist) =

British Journalist

- Born: 1983 (age 42–43); North Wales
- Education: Castell Alun High School
- Employers: BBC News; ITV News; LBC
- Website: davidharper.org

David Harper (born 1983) is a British journalist, television and radio news presenter. He is the Saturday Breakfast presenter for UK national news station, LBC News.

== Personal life ==
Harper grew up in the small village of Penyfordd in North Wales, attending Castell Alun High School in Hope, Flintshire.

In 2023 Harper shared that he had been diagnosed with Bipolar disorder. He admitted that he had struggled with the mental illness, and had previously tried medication.

== Career ==
He currently appears on television for BBC News and ITV News. He hosts the Saturday morning breakfast show on LBC News radio station. He has previously spent several years working for BBC Wales. He frequently covers topics related to mental health, business and social issues.

== Work contribution ==
He is a regular Presenter and Reporter for BBC Business, discussing topics like the resurgence of vinyl records.

He has been a regular announcer for The BBC World Service, including during special programmes and events

He has worked on ITV News, covering reports on a variety of topics.

He has been involved in LBC's live rolling news coverage.

He has spoken at events related to bipolar disorder and suicide prevention.
