= Evolutionary transition in individuality =

Evolutionary transition in individuality is the process through which descendants of independent organism become lower level units within a super-organism on a higher hierarchical level. Examples include cells assembling into a multicellular organism, or endosymbiosis of cells into more complex cells.

== See also ==
- Multicellular organism#Evolutionary history
- Superorganism
- The Major Transitions in Evolution
