= David M. Harper (zoologist) =

English zoologist specializing in limnology (born 1950)

David M. Harper (born 1950) is an English zoologist specialising in limnology.

Harper was born in Sussex, England, in 1950. He is a zoologist who graduated from the University of Oxford (New College) in 1972. He studied for a PhD in limnology in the Department of Biological Sciences, University of Dundee, submitting in 1978. He was appointed the first biologist to the Welland & Nene River Division of the Anglian Water Authority in order to develop a monitoring programme for their large new reservoir, now called Rutland Water. He moved to the University of Leicester in 1979, initially as tutor in science for the Adult Education Department, where he developed fully part-time certificates in ecology and in biology and a B.Sc. degree in human and environmental sciences. He moved to the Zoology Department, initially on a split appointment with adult education, latterly as senior lecturer in ecology as adult education (then called life-long learning) was scaled down by the university. He finished his career in the Biology Department, after botany and zoology merged, as professor of limnology and catchment science.

He has been active in ecohydrological research at Rift Valley lakes in East Africa, particularly Lake Naivasha and Lake Bogoria, Kenya since 1982 and in conservation-related river research in Eastern England over the same time period.

== Selected publications ==
Books

- David M Harper. Eutrophication of Freshwaters (Chapman & Hall; 1992)

Book chapters

- Robert Becht, David M Harper. Towards an understanding of human impact upon the hydrology of Lake Naivasha, Kenya. In Lake Naivasha, Kenya (Springer; 2002)

Research papers

- JL Kemp, DM Harper, GA Crosa (2000). The habitat-scale ecohydraulics of rivers. Ecological Engineering 16, 17–29
- JL Kemp, DM Harper, GA Crosa (1999). Use of ‘functional habitats’ to link ecology with morphology and hydrology in river rehabilitation. Aquatic Conservation: Marine and Freshwater Ecosystems 9, 159–178
- DM Harper, KM Mavuti, SM Muchiri (1990). Ecology and management of Lake Naivasha, Kenya, in relation to climatic change, alien species' introductions, and agricultural development. Environmental Conservation 17, 328–336
