= David Harper (biologist) =

David George Charles Harper is the senior lecturer in Evolutionary Biology in the School of Life Sciences at the University of Sussex, England. He lectures on animal diversity, Darwinism, co-operation and conflict in animal societies, wildlife conservation and applied systematics.

Harper was born in Sutton Coldfield, Birmingham. He earned his doctorate at the University of Cambridge and was a junior research fellow at St John's College, Oxford. In addition to lecturing, he researches the behavioural ecology of passerine birds, especially robins.

== Publications ==
Full list of publications as of 2023

- Maynard Smith, J. & Harper, D.G.C. (2003) Animal Signals. Oxford University Press, Oxford. ISBN 0-19-852685-7
- Brickle, N.W. & Harper, D.G.C. (2002). "Agricultural intensification and the timing of breeding of Corn Buntings Miliaria calandra". Bird Study 49: 219-236.
- Thomas, R.J., Szekely, T, Cuthill, I.C., Harper, D.G.C., Newson, S.E., Frayling, T.D., & Wallis, P.D. (2002) "Eye size in birds and the timing of song at dawn". Proceedings of the Royal Society, B. 269: 831-837.
- Brickle, N.W. & Harper, D.G.C. (2000) "Habitat use by Corn Buntings Miliaria calandra in winter and summer". In Aebischer, N.J., Evans, A.D., Grice, P.V. & Vickery, J.A. (eds) Ecology and Conservation of Lowland Farmland Birds: 156-164. Tring: British Ornithologists' Union.
- Gosler, A.G. & Harper, D.G.C. (2000) "Assessing the heritability of body condition in birds: a challenge exemplified by the Great Tit Parus major L. (Aves)". Biological Journal of the Linnean Society 71: 103-117.
- Brickle, N.W., Harper, D.G.C., Aebischer, N.J. & Cockayne, S.J. (2000) "Effects of agricultural intensification on the breeding success of corn buntings Miliaria calandra". Journal of Applied Ecology 37: 742-755.
