= Eörs Szathmáry =

Hungarian biologist

Eörs Szathmáry (born 1959) is a Hungarian theoretical evolutionary biologist at the now-defunct Collegium Budapest Institute for Advanced Study and at the Department of Plant Taxonomy and Ecology of Eötvös Loránd University, Budapest. He is the co-author with John Maynard Smith of The Major Transitions in Evolution, a seminal work which continues to contribute to ongoing issues in evolutionary biology. He is a member of the Batthyány Society of Professors.

== Main interest ==
His main interest is theoretical evolutionary biology and focuses on the common principles of the major steps in evolution, such as the origin of life, the emergence of cells, the origin of animal societies, and the appearance of human language. Together with his mentor, John Maynard Smith, he has published two important books which serve as the main references in the field (The Major Transitions in Evolution, Freeman, 1995, and The Origins of Life, Oxford University Press, 1999). Both books have been translated into other languages (so far, German, French, Japanese, and Hungarian). He serves on the editorial board of several journals (Journal of Theoretical Biology, Journal of Evolutionary Biology, Origins of Life and Evolution of the Biosphere, Evolutionary Ecology and Evolution of Communication).

== Awards ==
Professor Szathmáry was awarded the New Europe Prize in 1996 by a group of institutes for advanced study. He used the prize to establish the NEST (New Europe School for Theoretical Biology) foundation, whose task is to help young Hungarian theoretical biologists. The Juhász-Nagy junior fellowship that he endowed in 1996 at Collegium Budapest also serves this purpose. In 1996 he was the Executive Vice-President of ICSEB V (Fifth International Congress of Systematic and Evolutionary Biology) that took place in Budapest, partially sponsored by Collegium Budapest. He served as President of the International Organisation for Systematic and Evolutionary Biology (IOSEB, 1996–2002). The Hungarian Academy of Sciences acknowledged his outstanding scientific contribution with the Academy Prize in 1999. He was invited to prestigious institutions, including the Wissenschaftskolleg zu Berlin and the Collège de France. He is a member of Academia Europaea and the Hungarian Academy of Sciences.

== Achievements ==
Professor Szathmáry's main achievements include:

- a mathematical description of some phases of early evolution;
- a scenario for the origin of the genetic code;
- an analysis of epistasis in terms of metabolic control theory;
- a demonstration of the selection consequences of parabolic growth;
- a derivation of the optimal size of the genetic alphabet;
- a general framework to discuss the major transitions in evolution.
- a discussion on the confusion between hypercycle and collectively autocatalytic system (link)

== Author ==
Apart from the aforementioned co-authored books, he has also published numerous papers in important journals, including Nature, Science, Proceedings of the National Academy of Sciences of the USA, and Journal of Theoretical Biology.
