= David M. Harper (architect) =

American architect

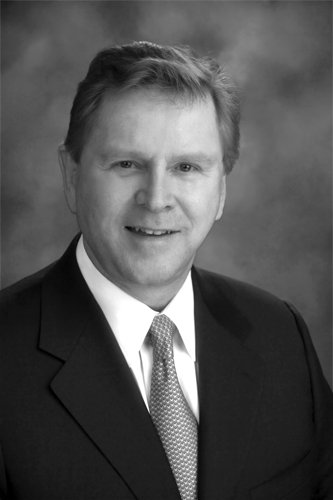
- David Michael Harper, FAIA, NCARB, LEED AP
- Education: The Institute for Architecture and Urban Studies; University of Miami School of Architecture
- Title: Fellow of the American Institute of Architects
- Website: www.harperpartnersinc.com

David Michael Harper is an American architect, business leader and sustainable energy advocate. He is currently the Principal Architect / Executive Vice President and Director of Higher Education for Stratus a multidisciplinary firm providing architecture, engineering, interior design and consulting. The Stratus firm has grown nationally to include a staff of over 600 and was formed from the acquisition of several prominent design firms including Zyscovich Architects which was headquartered in Miami. Harper was previously the Chief Design Officer, Practice Leader and Director for AtkinsRealis. Engineering News Record (ENR) ranked AtkinsRealis, formerly known as SNC-Lavalin Group, as the 19th largest Design and CM-PM firm in the world with 2022 Revenue of $1.5 Billion. Prior to his position with AtkinsRealis he was the Global Higher Education Practice Leader and the Managing Director for HKS, Inc.

Harper is the recipient of over a dozen architectural design awards including the 2015 AIA COTE Award for his Domus Alba Residence. His work has been featured in a variety of media outlets for over 25 years including the 2016 publication in Ocean Drive Magazine and Miami Home and Design Magazine. His college and university work has consistently received design awards including the 2014 AIA Orlando Award of Honor for FIU Parkview Housing.

In February 2015, Harper presented "Walking-the-Talk", initiative beginning with a lecture at the 2015 Miami Green Exposition and conference, linking architects and the public to lead by example and adapt to sustainability. Other lectures included the Miami Architecture Center on the topic of architects who have achieved LEED Certification in the design of their own homes.

In November 2012, HKS announced the acquisition of Harper's Miami-headquartered education design firm, HADP Architecture, Inc. a/k/a Harper Partners. The two firms had been working together on educational projects for more than 15 years prior to the merger, and wanted to expand their national education portfolio as well as increase resources and capabilities in the HKS Florida office locations

In 2016, AIA Florida named HKS Architects as the Firm of the Year. HKS has completed projects in health care, transportation, commercial, education, entertainment, hospitality, retail, and housing throughout Florida.

Soon after HKS acquired HADP Architecture, The Ohio State University selected HKS Inc. as the architectural firm to lead the $370 million Project revitalizing the campus’ North Residential District to accommodate a 3,872 student housing complex, two new dining facilities, recreation facility and more involving 12 new buildings and renovations to existing. Harper stated "HKS is proud to be taking the leadership design team role on the project." In 2016, the OSU North District Transformation Project was completed with eight additional new buildings. The new dorm rooms encourage interaction in common areas to promote socialization and connections rather than individual luxury perks.

Harper was recognized in 2012 in Architecture Leaders Today magazine for his design of three student housing projects, and in Habitation Design Magazine for Best Conceptual Student Housing Design. In June 2012, industry publication Architectural Record recognized Harper's former firm HADP Architecture in their annual Top 250 Architecture Firms list.

== Leadership and social responsibility ==
=== Serving and educating the public ===
In 2012, Harper completed the design of a residence which produces its own energy and met LEED Gold for Homes standards. The home, Domus Alba, completed construction in 2014 and was featured in Ocean Drive Magazine Florida Design Magazine Miami Home and Design Magazine Florida Caribbean Architect Magazine Pinecrest Sun Magazine and Pinecrest Magazine. The American Institute of America Miami Chapter Committee for the Environment recognized Harper's design with the Award in Merit in 2015 and as the 2014 USGBC South Florida Chapter Most Outstanding LEED for Homes Single-Family Project. The Village of Pinecrest issued a proclamation declaring Domus Alba as the first Green Home, LEED certified as part of Pinecrest's Sustainable Building Program. The project won silver for Best Conceptual Home Design in habitation Design Magazine's National Dream Home Awards contest.

Harper partnered with Florida International University (FIU) to use the home as a sustainability training tool for students and faculty in the FIU departments of engineering, architecture, and interior design.

Industry publications including Architecture Magazine, Progressive Architecture, Florida Architect Magazine, Florida Trend, and Inc. Magazine have all interviewed Harper for architectural advice and educational information, as well as design and construction in South Florida.

In the aftermath of Hurricane Andrew in 1992, Harper served as Chairman of the South Florida Building Code Committee which was responsible for rewriting the Building Code and reforming the way homes and educational facilities are built.

Former City of Miami Mayor, Xavier Suarez and former Florida Governor, Jeb Bush, recommended Harper to the fellowship of the AIA as result of his efforts after Hurricane Andrew.

CNN News and The Miami Herald have interviewed David Harper about architecture and disaster response, especially in conjunction with the architectural strength of buildings in South Florida during a hurricane.

Harper served on the Citizens Board of the University of Miami, and has served as a Visiting lecturer in the College of Architecture at Florida International University (F.I.U). Harper also serves on the University President's Council and on the Dean's advisory board of the College of Architecture and the Arts (CARTA) at F.I.U. Previously, Harper served on the board of trustees of the Historical Association of South Florida (now called HistoryMiami), which is responsible for the Historical Museum of South Florida and the Woodrow W. Wilkins Architectural Archives section of the Museum.

In Atlanta, Harper served for 10 years on the board of trustees of the North Metro Miracle League, where he provided the pro-bono design for the “Family Center” part of the Adaptive Sports Complex located in Alpharetta, Ga. Most recently in 2017 and 2018, David has served as an instructor in practice in the Department of Architecture at Florida International University where he began as a guest lecturer in 2014.

=== Sustainability and renewable energy ===
David Harper was selected as the "Sustainable Architect of the Year" by AIA Miami for 2019 - 2020. Harper holds the certification LEED Accredited Professional. LEED-certified buildings have healthier environments, which in turn contribute to higher productivity and improved health and comfort to residents and staff. David Harper served as Principal- in- Charge on the UC San Diego Live-Learn Neighborhood, which was completed in 2021 and is the largest LEED platinum university project ever built. The project was selected by the American Institute of Architects (AIA) as winner of the 2023 COTE Award.

In 2012, green building products distributor Alterna Corp. partnered with David Harper on his Green Energy Home project Domus Alba.”

Two projects headed by Harper are LEED Gold Certified: Georgia Institute of Technology-North Avenue Apartments renovations have achieved LEED EB O&M Gold Certification, currently the largest university housing building with this certification worldwide. The University of Georgia, Building 1516 in the Reed Community, is also LEED Gold Certified.

LEED Silver Certifications include Meredith College in North Carolina, Florida Gulf Coast University in Ft. Myers, Fla and the University of Alabama in Huntsville Charger Village.

Other higher education sustainable designed projects led by Harper utilize LEED Principles, such as the University of Houston-Wheeler Housing (Cougar Village I), New College of Florida-Residence Halls, Armstrong Atlantic State University-Winward Commons, Kennesaw State University-University Village, and Florida Institute of Technology-Harris Village Suites.

== Early studies and career (1971–84) ==
While a student at UM, Harper served as President of the Student Chapter of the American Institute of Architects, and launched the student architectural newspaper AIM, becoming its first editor. He also served the entire undergraduate student body in Student Government as Chairman of Community Affairs, forming the Gardner-Harper Commission to serve as a bridge between the university and the City of Coral Gables.

Harper’s first project Green Library at Florida International University.

In 1973, while still a student, Harper designed his first professional project: the Steven and Dorothea Green Library at Florida International University’s Modesto A. Maidique Campus.

As a result, the firm at which he worked, Ferendino/Grafton/Spillis/Candela, put Harper on a fast track, a decision Harper said “...ultimately led me to start my own firm...” In 2012, Florida International University recognized Harper for his three decades of design on the campus and financial contributions to the FIU Library, where he was honored by the university with the naming of the library’s central activity space, “The David M. Harper Family Atrium.” Harper's original design from the 1970s was three stories. The library has since undergone an expansion which added five additional floors.

Harper was also awarded First Prize in a design competition for the new Miami Dade County downtown public library. The competition recognized the top designer at the university for his/her senior year architectural design project. Miami-Dade County then presented Harper's project to the public during the process of planning for the new county library.

In 1974, the Institute for Architecture and Urban Studies (IAUS) invited Harper to spend his thesis year in New York City (the IAUS functioned under architect Peter Eisenman who developed its curriculum and began its undergraduate education program in 1973). The program was open to an élite group of invited students from a consortium of distinguished liberal arts colleges and schools of architecture.

Upon his graduation from the University of Miami in 1975, Harper was awarded the Alpha Rho Chi Medal.

In 1979, Harper established his firm, "Harper & Buzinec," and by 1984, had a staff of 47 and nearly $82 million worth of designs in various stages of production. Former partner Paul Buzinec was quoted as saying, "David's at the top of the pyramid. His imagination and enthusiasm keep him up." George Allen, executive vice president of the Florida Association of the American Institute of Architects said, "David has a unique capability in the field of architecture." And mentor Ed Grafton, who handpicked David as a protégé said, "I thought he was very bright and quick. And that's the whole business of personal service. You're not baking bread and you're not making automobiles. The whole is people's minds - that's what you sell."

His professional growth is accredited to his aggressive marketing techniques, good design sense, and knowledge of business management and diplomacy. In 1980, Harper's regional and national design work gained recognition with the winning remodel design of the FA/AIA Headquarters Building in Tallahassee. The project was completed in early 1982.

== Awards ==
=== American Institute of Architects – Design Awards ===
- The Florida Association of the American Institute of Architects
  - Award of Honor – AIA Headquarters Building
- The Miami Chapter of the American Institute of Architects
  - Award of Merit for Sustainability- Committee on the Environment (David M. Harper - Domus Alba)
  - Award of Excellence Built Category (Harper Carreño Mateu, Inc.) – Student Apartment Facility at Florida Atlantic University
  - Award of Merit for Design – Turner Guilford Knight Correctional Center
  - Award of Honor in Architecture – PSB/UPH Building, U.S. Coast Guard Base
  - Award of Merit for Unbuilt Category (Harper Carreño Mateu, Inc.) – U.S. Coast Guard Station at Hobe Sound
  - Award for Excellence Built Category (Harper Carreño Mateu, Inc.) – Miami Job Corps Center
- The Orlando Chapter of the American Institute of Architects
  - Award of Honor- Florida International University Parkview Student Housing

==== Industry Awards ====
- 2014 USGBC South Florida Chapter Most Outstanding LEED for Homes Single-Family Project - Domus Alba
- Gold Award for Best Conceptual Student Housing Design-habitation Design Magazine (HADP/HKS Joint Venture) – Parkview Housing at Florida International University
- Award for Best Conceptual Home Design-Habitation Design Magazine – Green Energy Home in Pinecrest, FL
- Alpha Rho Chi Medal in Architecture, University of Miami
- Merrill Lynch/Ernst & Young Entrepreneur of the Year – Finalist
- INC. Magazine CEO – Top 500 private companies
- Architectural Record magazine – Top 250 Architecture Firms
- Price Waterhouse-South Florida Magazine Up & Comers – Award
- Lou Tassee Award – For outstanding contributions to community education

== Notable projects ==
- American Airlines World Gateway Terminal, Miami, FL
- Hartsfield-Jackson Atlanta International Airport Expansion, Atlanta, GA
- Beijing Oriental Hotel, China
- Biltmore Hotel Conference Center of the Americas, Coral Gables, FL
- United States Coast Guard, Miami Beach, FL
- US Department of Labor Job Corps Center, Miami, FL
- Turner Guilford Knight Center, Dade County, FL
- FA/AIA Headquarters Building, Tallahassee, FL

=== Higher education ===
- UC San Diego North Torrey Pines Live-Learn Neighborhood- Seeking LEED Platinum
- The Ohio State University, North Residential District - LEED Silver
- Georgia Institute of Technology, North Avenue Apartments renovations – LEED GOLD Certified EB O&M, Former Olympic Village Gets the Gold-LEED Gold
- University of Georgia, Building 1516 – LEED GOLD Certified, Building 1516 Receives Honors
- Meredith College, The Oaks Apartments – LEED Silver Certified
- University of Houston, Cougar Village
- University of Alabama, Ridgecrest South I & II
- University of Alabama in Huntsville, New Residence Hall, Dining Facility, and Parking Garage - LEED Silver Certified
- Armstrong Atlantic State University, Winward Commons
- Florida Gulf Coast University, South Village Biscayne Hall – LEED Silver Certified
- Florida International University, Student Housing - Parkview Hall LEED Silver Certified

== Gallery ==
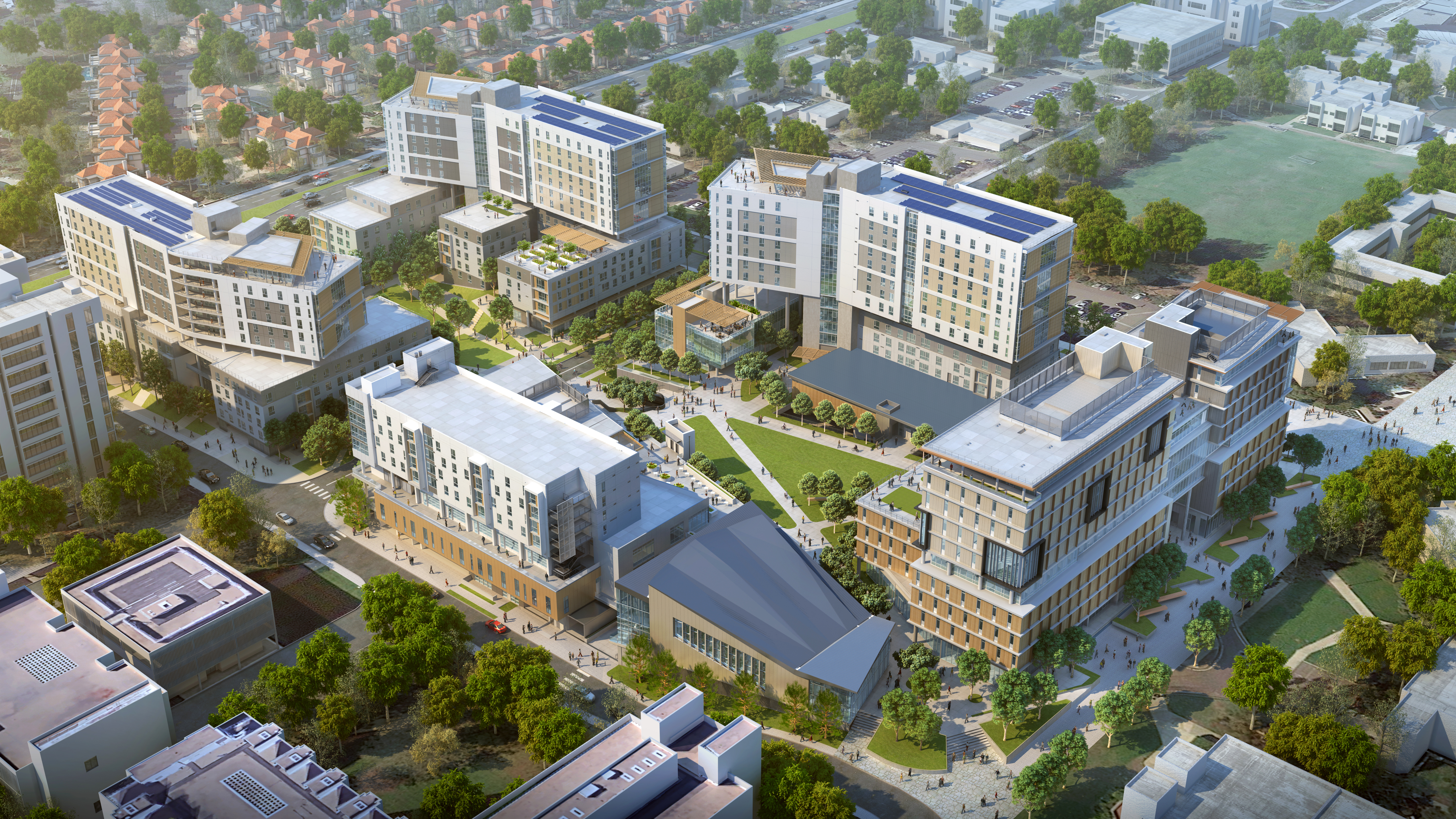
University of California San Diego North Torrey Pines Living & Learning Neighborhood

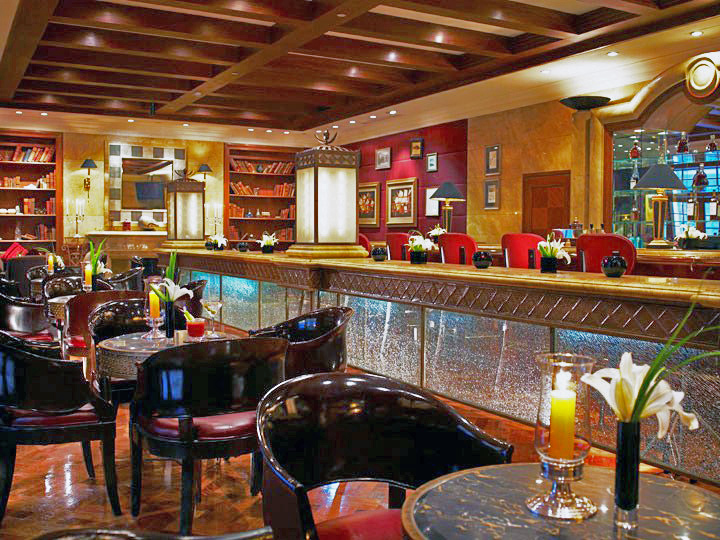
St. Regis Oriental Hotel, Beijing, China, Interior Architecture

Miami International Airport, American Airlines World Gateway Terminal

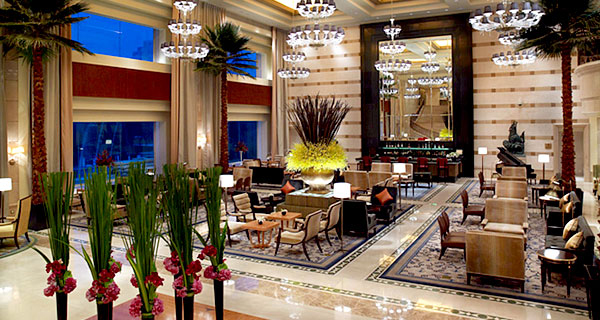
St. Regis Oriental Hotel, Beijing, China, Interior Architecture

Miami International Airport, American Airlines Concourse Interior

US Coast Guard, Miami Beach

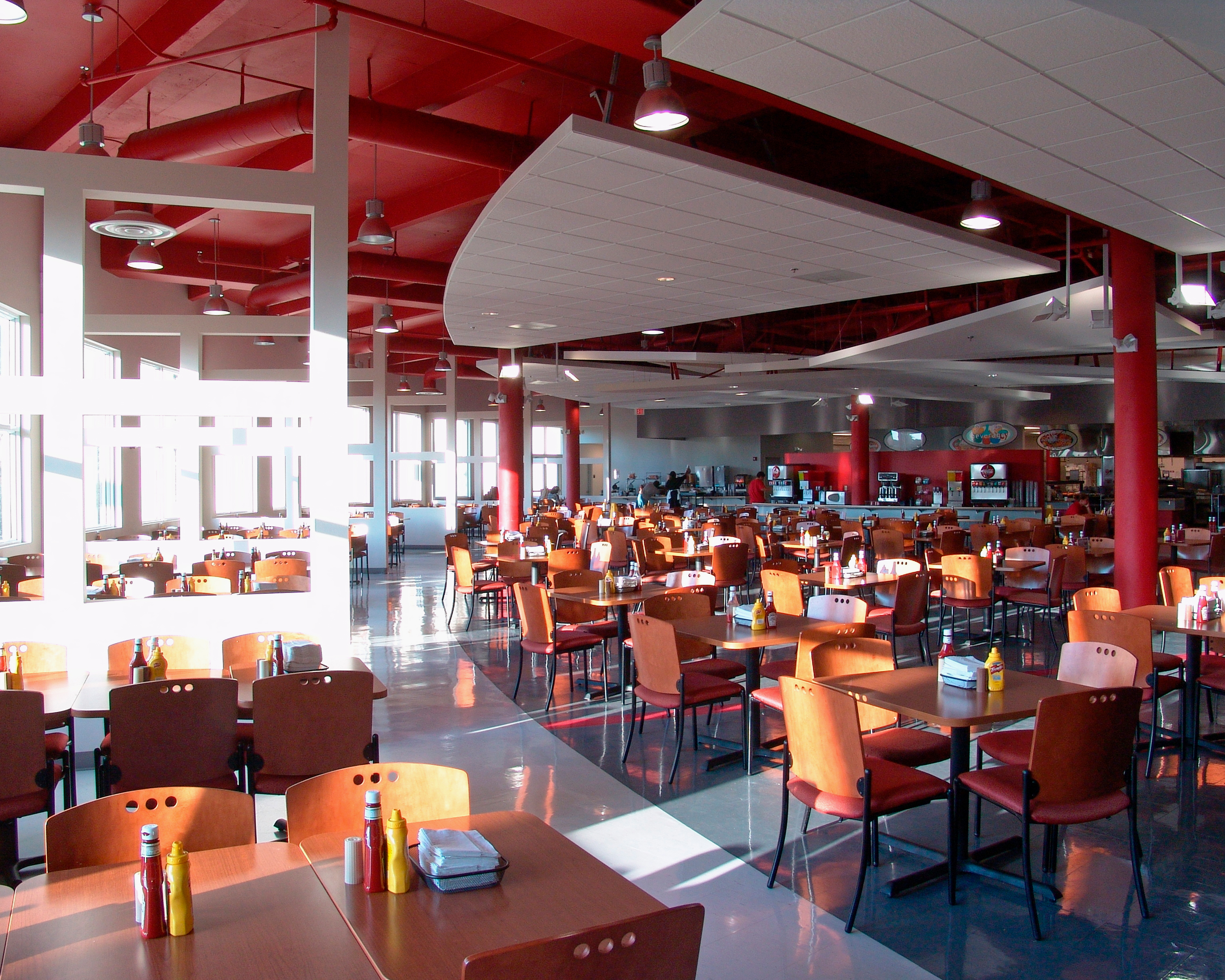
Barry University Student Center

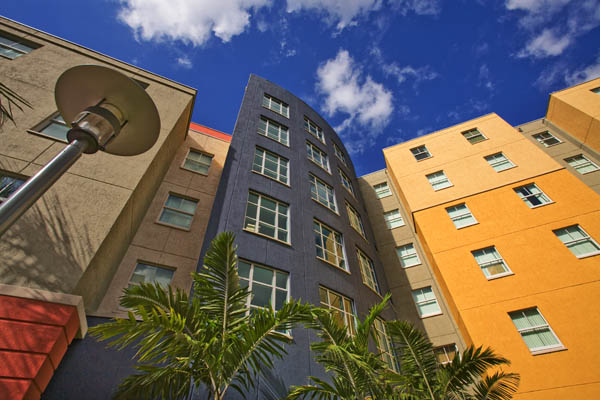
Florida International Univ., Lakeview Hall

University of Houston, Cougar Village

University of Georgia, Building 1516

New College of Florida student housing

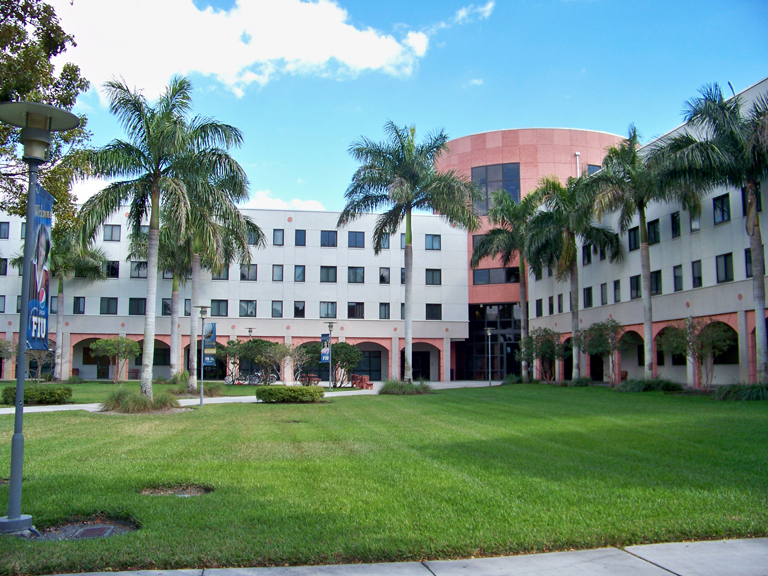
Florida International Univ. Everglades Hall

University of Alabama, Ridgecrest South I & II

New College of Florida dorms

University of Alabama, residence Main Entry

University of Georgia, Building 1516

Turner Gilford Knight corrections center

University of Georgia, Student Housing Lobby

University of Georgia, Student Housing, Building 1516

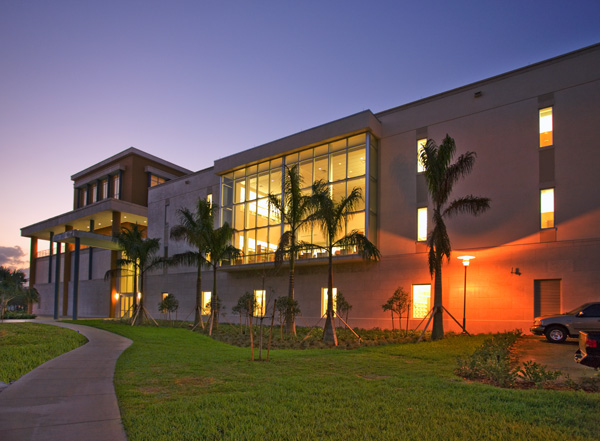
Florida International University, The Diaz-Balart Hall School of Law

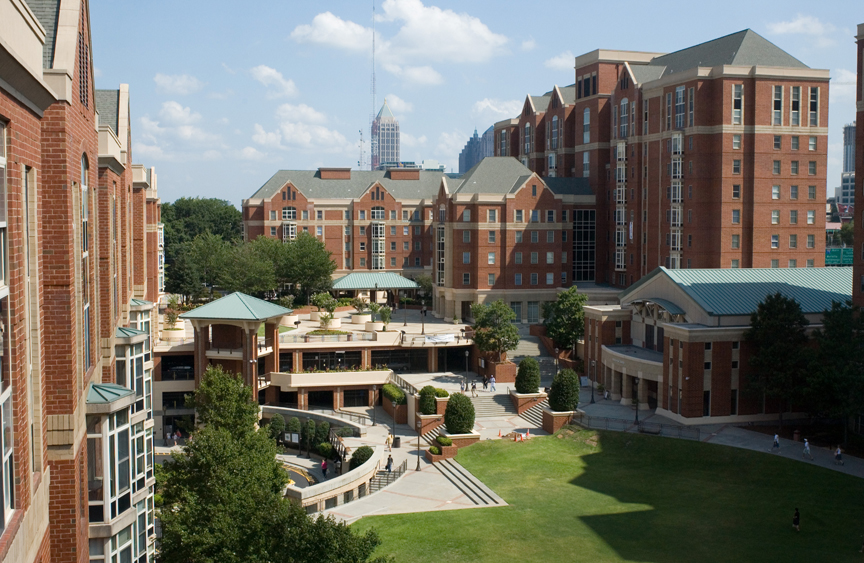
Georgia Institute of Technology, North Avenue Apartments

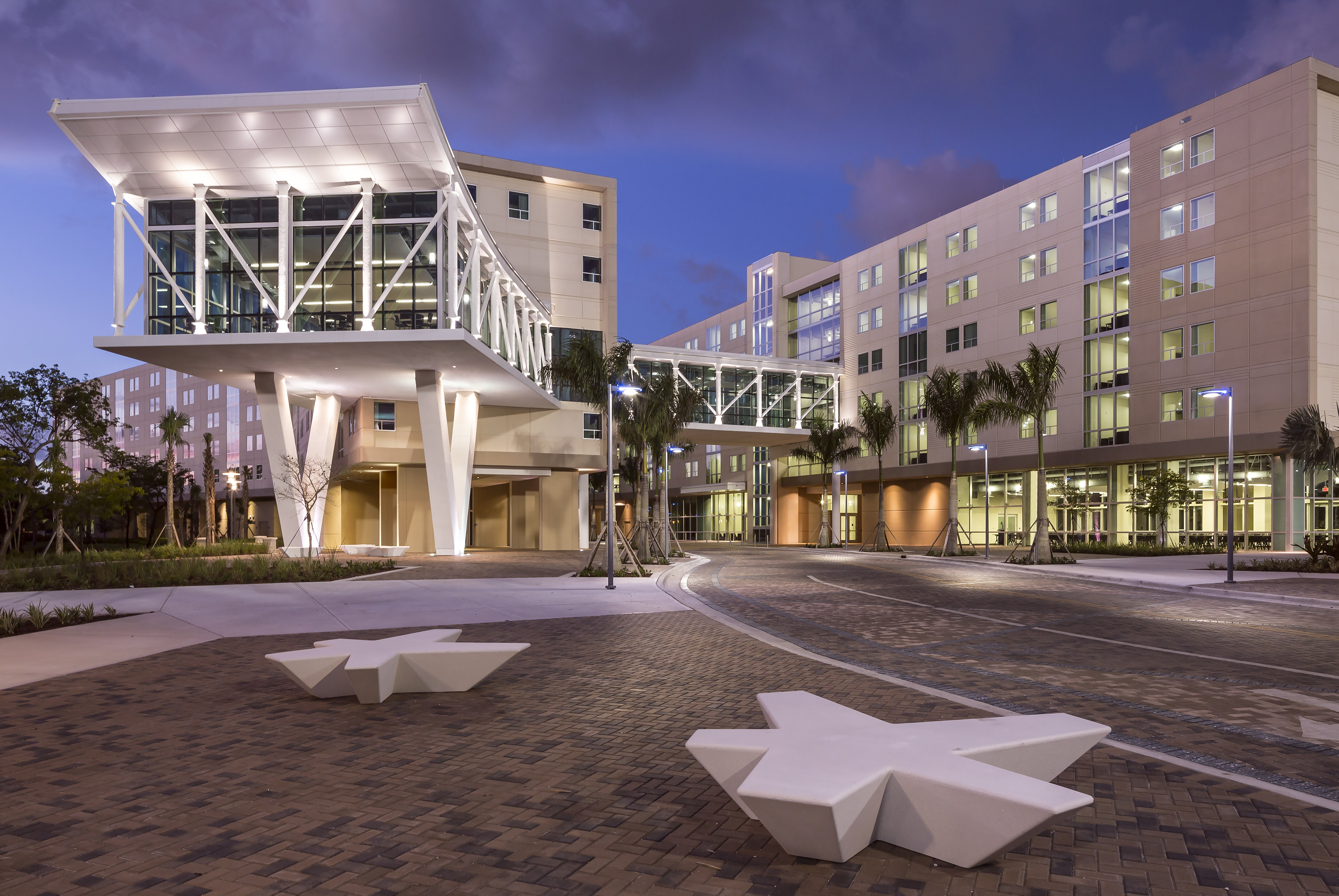
Florida International University Parkview Housing
