= Ernest Lane (surgeon) =

British surgeon (1857–1926)

James Ernest Lane FRCS (24 July 1857 – 4 November 1926) was a British surgeon. He was head surgeon at St Mary's Hospital, London from 1904 to 1922. He was the son of James R. Lane and grandnephew of Samuel Armstrong Lane.
