= Sexy son hypothesis =

Postulate in biology

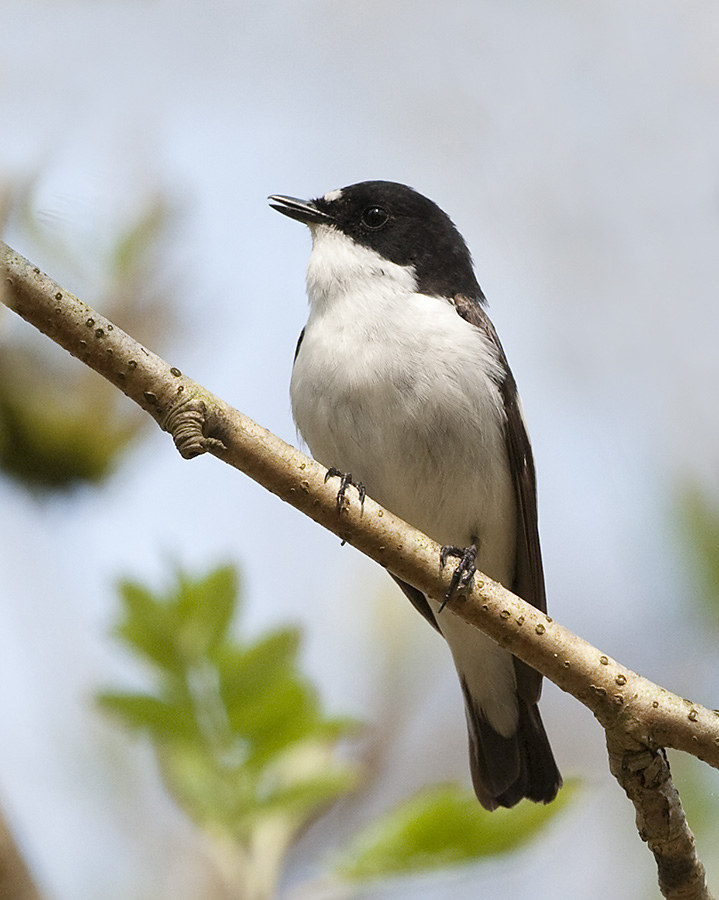
European pied flycatcher (Ficedula hypoleuca)

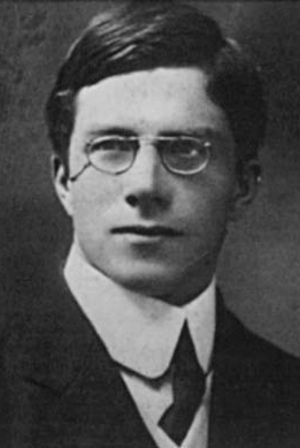
Ronald Fisher in 1912

The sexy son hypothesis in evolutionary biology and sexual selection, proposed by Patrick J. Weatherhead and Raleigh J. Robertson of Queen’s University in Kingston, Ontario in 1979, states that a female's ideal mate choice among potential mates is one whose genes will produce males with the best chance of reproductive success. This implies that other benefits the father can offer the mother or offspring are less relevant than they may appear, including his capacity as a parental caregiver, territory and any nuptial gifts. Fisher's principle means that the sex ratio (except in certain eusocial insects) is always near 1:1 between males and females, yet what matters most are the female's "sexy sons'" future breeding successes, more likely if they have a promiscuous father, in creating large numbers of offspring carrying copies of her genes. This sexual selection hypothesis has been researched in species such as the European pied flycatcher (Ficedula hypoleuca).

== Context ==
Female mating preferences are widely recognized as being responsible for the rapid and divergent evolution of male secondary sex characteristics. In 1915, Ronald Fisher wrote:

Granted that while this taste and preference prevails among the females of the species, the males will grow more and more elaborate and beautiful tail feathers, the question must be answered "Why have the females this taste? Of what use is it to the species that they should select this seemingly useless ornament?" The first step to a solution lies in the fact that the success of an animal in the struggle for existence is not measured only by the number of offspring which it produces and rears, but also by the probable success of these offspring. So that in selecting a mate from a number of different competitors, it is important to select that one which is most likely to produce successful children.

In 1976, prior to Weatherhead and Robertson's paper, Richard Dawkins wrote in his book The Selfish Gene:

In a society where males compete with each other to be chosen as he-men by females, one of the best things a mother can do for her genes is to make a son who will turn out in his turn to be an attractive he-man. If she can ensure that her son is one of the fortunate few males who wins most of the copulations in the society when he grows up, she will have an enormous number of grandchildren. The result of this is that one of the most desirable qualities a male can have in the eyes of a female is, quite simply, sexual attractiveness itself.

Ronald Fisher's principle, as published in his book The Genetical Theory of Natural Selection, is one of several possible explanations for the highly diverse and often astonishing ornaments of animals. If females choose physically attractive males, they will tend to get physically attractive sons, and, thus more grandchildren, because other choosy females will prefer their attractive, sexy sons. The theory will function regardless of the physical or behavioral trait a female chooses, as long as it is heritable (that is, the trait varies between individuals of the population), because it is possessing the trait that makes males attractive, and not the qualities of the trait in itself. Once a preference becomes established, females choosing males with elaborate secondary sexual traits will produce sons that carry alleles for the trait and produce daughters that carry alleles for the preference, generating genetic coupling that will drive self-reinforcing coevolution of both trait and preference, due to the mating advantage of males with the trait, creating a Fisherian runaway sexy sons process. Similar models have been proposed for postcopulatory female preferences, such as the time at which females removed the male's sperm ampulla after mating. Sexual selection by direct and/or indirect benefits as well as sexual conflict determine the evolution of animal mating systems.

In its original context, the "narrow-sense sexy son hypothesis" of Weatherhead and Robertson refers to mating systems with care from both parents. In these mating systems, females that mate with a polygynous male normally receive less assistance than females mated with a monogamous male, and thus suffer from direct fitness consequences that have to be (at least) compensated for by the breeding successes of their sexy sons. On the other hand, a "broad-sense sexy son hypothesis" encompasses both polygyny and promiscuous mating systems, with and without care from both parents. Alatalo (1998) argues that the costs of any additional choice may be so minor that female choice for honestly signaling males, that is good genes, may evolve even if the indirect benefits on offspring quality are small. A similar argument can be made for the sexy son hypothesis if mates of attractive males do not suffer any direct fitness consequences.

== Sexual conflict ==
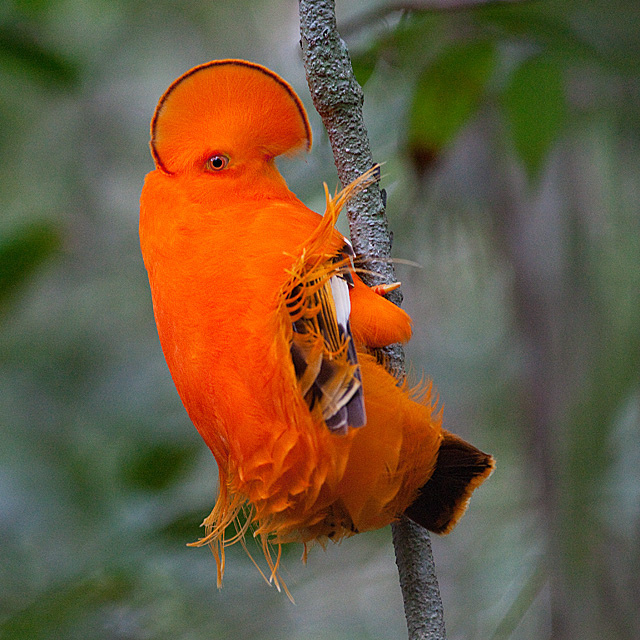
Guianan cock-of-the-rock (Rupicola rupicola)

Sexual conflict refers to the conflicting goals of breeding males and females. It describes the diverging interests of males and females in optimizing their fitness. From the viewpoint of any one partner, the best outcome would be for the partner's mate to care for the young, thus freeing up their own resources (e.g., time and energy) that s/he—but typically he—can invest in further sex that may create additional offspring. In polygynous mating systems, sexual conflict means the optimization of male reproductive success by having mated with multiple females, even though the reproductive success of a polygynously mated female is thereby reduced. Such can be the case for the Guianan cock-of-the-rocks (Rupicola rupicola), whose male members spend a majority of their time and energy maintaining their plumage and attempting to seek the most matings. Females, on the other hand, spend their time building and maintaining their nest where they will lay their eggs and raise the young.

== Good genes theory ==
"Good genes" theory proposes that females select males seen to have genetic advantages that increase offspring quality. Increased viability of offspring provides compensation for any lower reproductive success that results from their being "picky". The good-gene hypothesis for polyandry proposes that when females encounter better males than their previous mates, they re-mate in order to fertilize their eggs with the better male's sperm.

Dung beetles who have selected mates with better genetics tend to have offspring that survive longer and are more able to reproduce than those that do not pick mates with genetic quality. This suggests that carefully choosing a mate is beneficial.

Another study notes that pronghorn (Antilocapra americana) females engage in an obvious and energetically expensive mate sampling process to identify vigorous males. Though each female selects independently, the outcome is that a small proportion of the herd's males sire most young. Offspring of attractive males were more likely to survive to weaning and to age classes as late as 5 years, apparently due to faster growth rates. Because pronghorn males do not have costly ornaments, the authors conclude that female choice for good genes can exist in the absence of obvious sexual selection cues such as elaborate antlers.

The sexy son hypothesis is closely related to the good genes assumption and the Fisherian runaway selection process. Like good genes, the sexy son hypothesis assumes the existence of indirect genetic benefits that are able to compensate for any inferior direct reproductive success (i.e., fewer offspring). The main difference between good genes and the sexy son hypothesis is that the latter assumes an indirect effect due to the attractiveness of the sons, whereas good genes focus on the viability of both sons and daughters. However, "attractiveness" is not narrowly defined, and can refer to every trait that increases a male's probability to become polygynous.

== Sperm models ==
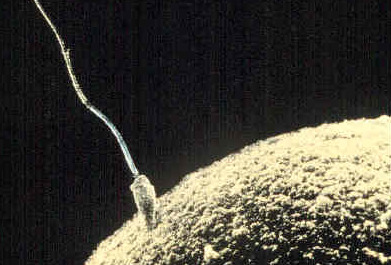
The successful sperm is the one that fuses with the egg.

Good-sperm models predict positive genetic associations between a male's sperm competitiveness and the general viability of his offspring, whereas sexy-sperm models predict that multiple-mating females produce more grandchildren. As with precopulatory processes, postcopulatory models predict that the trait in males that determines fertilization success will become genetically coupled with the mechanism by which females choose the sperm of preferred males.

== See also ==
- Sexual selection in humans
- Strategic pluralism
