= Secondary sex characteristic =

Features that occur in an organism at sexual maturity

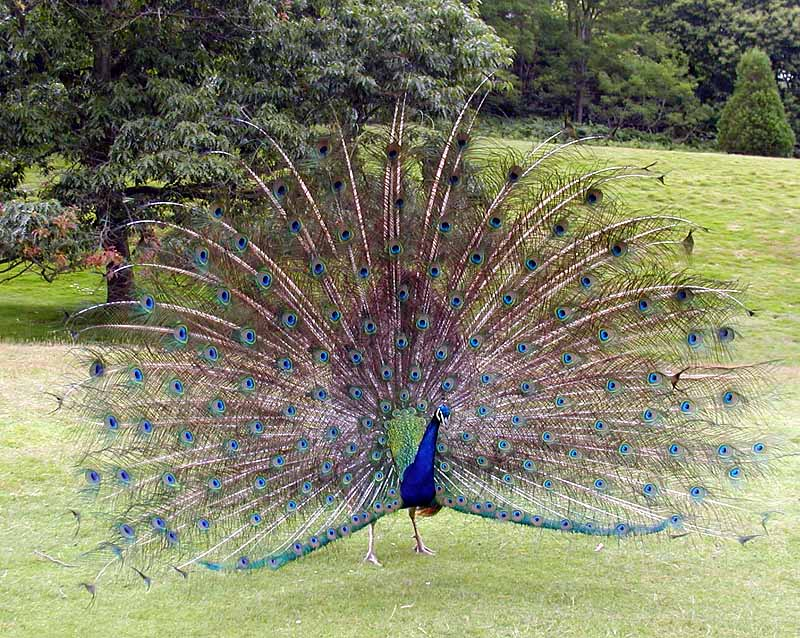
A peacock displays his long, colored tail, an example of his secondary sex characteristics.

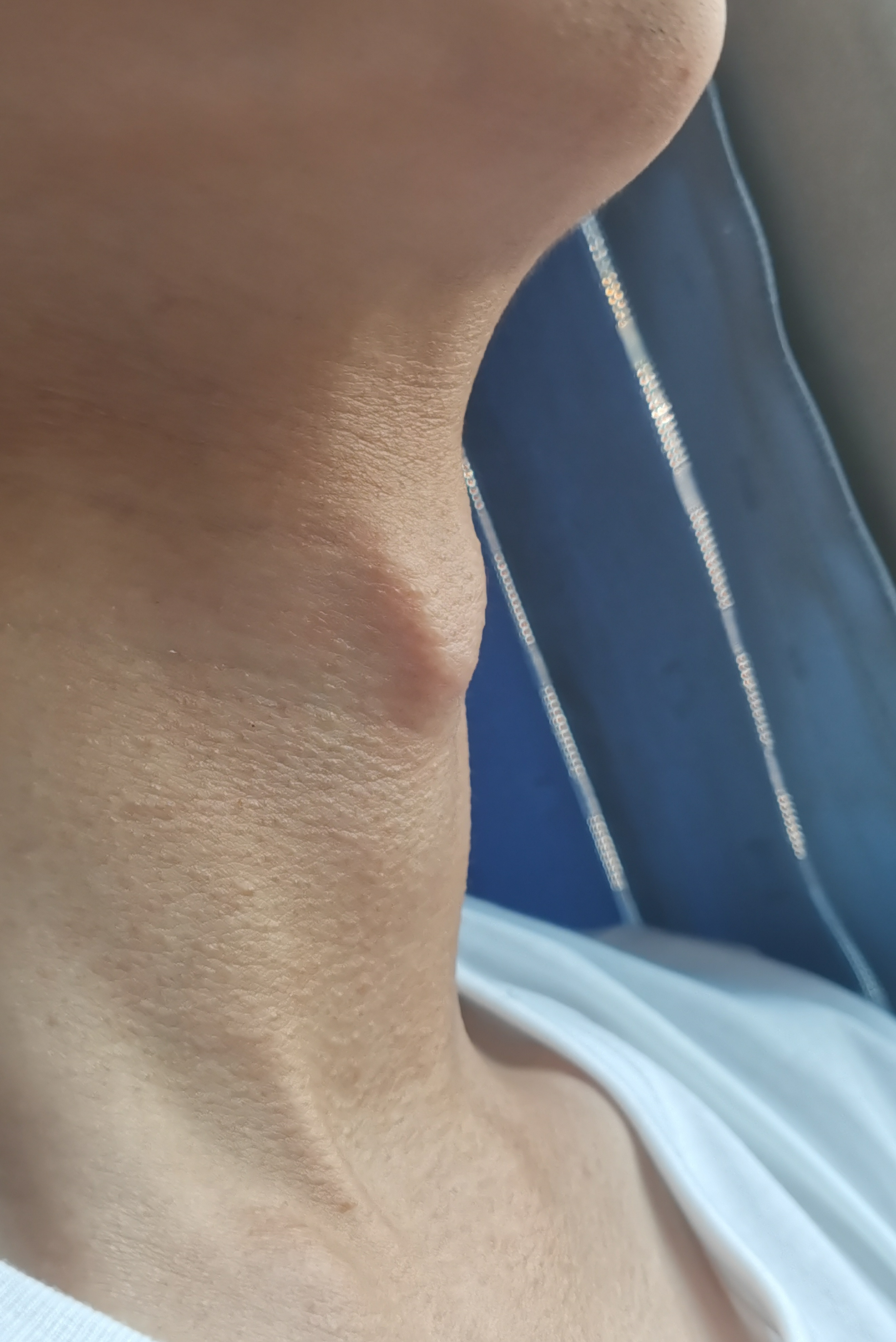
An adult human's Adam's apple, a visible secondary sex characteristic common in males

A secondary sex characteristic (or secondary sexual characteristic) is a physical characteristic of an organism that is related to or derived from its sex, but not directly part of its reproductive system. In humans, these characteristics typically start to appear during puberty—and include enlarged breasts and widened hips of females, facial hair and Adam's apples on males, and pubic hair on both. In non-human animals, they can start to appear at sexual maturity—and include, for example, the manes of male lions, the bright facial and rump coloration of male mandrills, and horns in many goats and antelopes.

Secondary sex characteristics are particularly evident in the sexually dimorphic phenotypic traits that distinguish the sexes of a species. In evolution, secondary sex characteristics are the product of sexual selection for traits that show fitness, giving an organism an advantage over its rivals in courtship and in aggressive interactions.

Many characteristics are believed to have been established by a positive feedback loop known as the Fisherian runaway produced by the secondary characteristic in one sex and the desire for that characteristic in the other sex. Male birds and fish of many species have brighter coloration or other external ornaments. Differences in size between sexes are also considered secondary sexual characteristics.

== Secondary sex characteristics vs. primary sex characteristics ==
The reproductive organs in male or female mammals that are usually identifiable at birth are described as the primary sex characteristics or sex organs. In the male, these are the penis, testes, and scrotum. In the female, these are the ovaries, fallopian tubes, uterus, cervix, vagina and vulva. The primary sex organs are different from the secondary sex organs because at maturity they are directly related to the production gametes, which are haploid male or female germ cells, and their uniting with one another during sexual reproduction to form a zygote.

The secondary sex characteristics differ in that they will not be identifiable at birth, they will develop as the subject becomes sexually mature. In mammals, these characteristics may include increased mammary tissue in females and greater muscle mass in males. Secondary sexual characteristics have an evolutionary purpose: increase the chance of breeding.

== Evolutionary roots ==
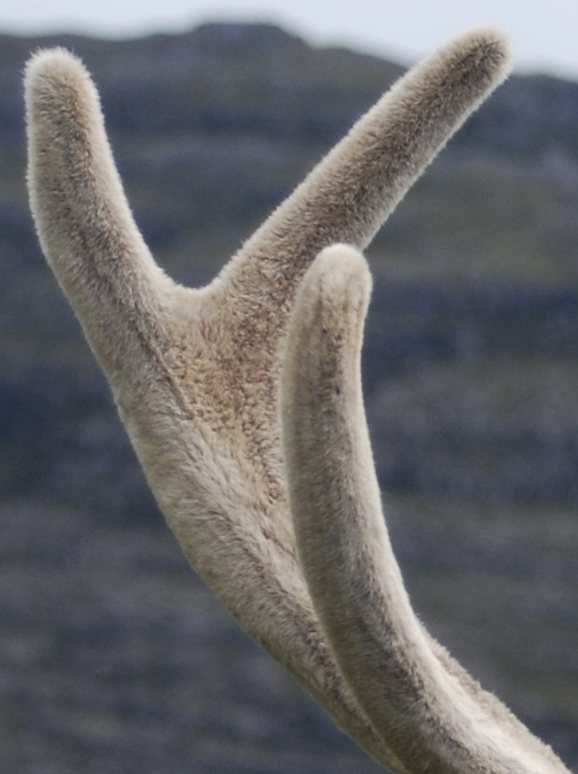
A red deer stag's antlers are secondary sexual characteristics.

In The Descent of Man and Selection in Relation to Sex, Charles Darwin hypothesized that sexual selection, or competition within a species for mates, can explain observed differences between sexes in many species.

Ronald Fisher, the English biologist, developed a number of ideas concerning secondary characteristics in his 1930 book The Genetical Theory of Natural Selection, including the concept of Fisherian runaway which postulates that the desire for a characteristic in females combined with that characteristic in males can create a positive feedback loop or runaway where the feature becomes hugely amplified. The 1975 handicap principle extends this idea, stating that a peacock's tail, for instance, displays fitness by being a useless impediment that is very hard to fake. Another of Fisher's ideas is the sexy son hypothesis, whereby females will desire to have sons that possess the characteristic that they find sexually attractive in order to maximize the number of grandchildren they produce. An alternative hypothesis is that some of the genes that enable males to develop impressive ornaments or fighting ability may be correlated with fitness markers such as disease resistance or a more efficient metabolism. This idea is known as the good genes hypothesis.

== In non-human animals ==
Examples of secondary sex characteristics in non-human animals include manes of male lions and long feathers of male peafowl, the tusks of male narwhals, enlarged proboscises in male elephant seals and proboscis monkeys, the bright facial and rump coloration of male mandrills, horns in many goats and antelopes, and the swollen upper lip and elongated premaxillary and maxillary teeth of male spikethumb frogs. Male fish develop "nuptial tubercles", mainly on their snouts, in the breeding season. These are an honest signal of health, and may assist females in sexual selection for species that use lek mating, such as the roach Rutilus rutilus.

Biologists today distinguish between "male-to-male combat" and "mate choice", usually female choice of male mates. Sexual characteristics due to combat are such things as antlers, horns, and greater size. Characteristics due to mate choice, often referred to as ornaments, include brighter plumage, coloration, and other features that have no immediate purpose for survival or combat.

Male jumping spiders have visual patches of UV reflectance, which are ornamentations used to attract females.

== In humans ==
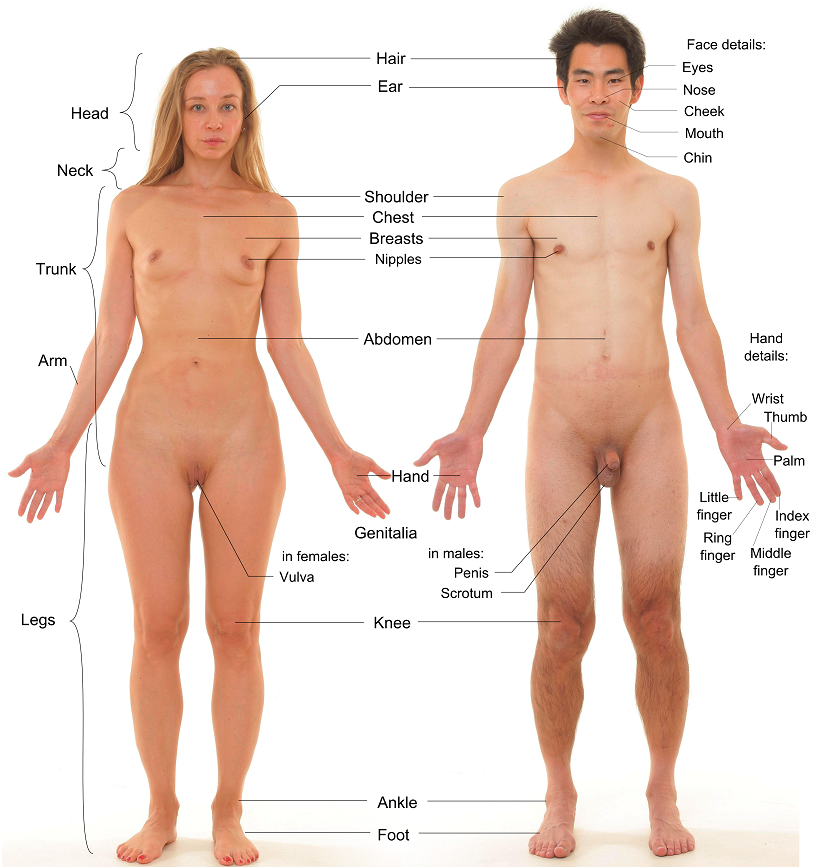
Anatomical characteristics of the human female and male

Sexual differentiation begins during gestation, when the gonads are formed. The general structure and shape of the body and face, as well as sex hormone levels, are similar in preadolescent boys and girls. As puberty begins and sex hormone levels rise, differences appear, though some changes are similar in males and females. Male levels of testosterone directly induce the growth of the genitals, and indirectly (via dihydrotestosterone (DHT)) the prostate. Estradiol and other hormones cause breasts to develop in females. However, fetal or neonatal androgens may modulate later breast development by reducing the capacity of breast tissue to respond to later estrogen.

Underarm hair and pubic hair are usually considered secondary sex characteristics, but they may also be considered non-secondary sex characteristics because they are features of both sexes following puberty.

=== Females ===
In females, breasts are a manifestation of higher levels of estrogen; estrogen also widens the pelvis and increases the amount of body fat in hips, thighs, buttocks, and breasts. Estrogen also induces growth of the uterus, proliferation of the endometrium, and menstruation. Female secondary sex characteristics include:

- Enlargement of breasts and erection of nipples.
- Growth of body hair, most prominently underarm and pubic hair.
- Widening of hips; lower waist to hip ratio than adult males.

=== Males ===
The increased secretion of testosterone from the testes during puberty causes the male secondary sexual characteristics to be manifested. Testosterone directly increases size and mass of muscles, vocal cords, and bones, deepening of the voice, and changing the shape of the face and skeleton. Converted into DHT in the skin, it accelerates growth of androgen-responsive facial and body hair but may slow and eventually stop the growth of head hair. Taller stature is largely a result of later puberty and slower epiphyseal fusion. Overall, male secondary sex characteristics include:

- Growth of body hair, including underarm, abdominal, chest, and pubic hair; body hair is more prominent in males than females, on average.
- Growth of facial hair.
- Enlargement of the larynx (Adam's apple) and deepening of the voice.
- Increased stature; adult males are taller than adult females, on average.
- Heavier skull and bone structure.
- Increased muscle mass and strength.
- Broadening of the shoulders and the chest; the shoulders are wider than the hips.
- Increased secretions of the oil and sweat glands.
- Increased body odor that plays an important role in human sexual attraction, by indicating MHC/HLA heterozygosity.
