= Strategic pluralism =

Theory in evolutionary psychology

Strategic pluralism (also known as the dual-mating strategy) is a theory in evolutionary psychology regarding human mating strategies that suggests women have evolved to evaluate men in two categories: whether they are reliable long term providers, and whether they contain high quality genes. The theory of strategic pluralism was proposed by Steven Gangestad and Jeffry Simpson, two professors of psychology at the University of New Mexico and Texas A&M University, respectively.

== Experiments and studies ==
Although strategic pluralism is believed to occur for both animals and humans, the majority of experiments have been performed with humans. One experiment concluded that between short term and long-term relationships, males and females prioritized different things. It was shown that both preferred physical attractiveness for short term mates. However, for long term, females preferred males with traits that indicated that they could be better caretakers, whereas the males did not change their priorities.

The experimenters used the following setup: subjects were given an overall 'budget' and asked to assign points to different traits. For long-term mates, women gave more points to social and kindness traits, agreeing with results found in other studies suggesting that females prefer long-term mates who would provide resources and emotional security for them, as opposed to physically attractive mates. The females also prefer males who can offer them more financial security as this would help them raise their offspring.

Females have also chosen males who have more feminine appearances because of a (hypothesized) inverse relationship between a male's facial attractiveness and effort willing to spend in raising offspring. That is, in theory, a more attractive male would put in less work as a caretaker while a less attractive male would put in more work. On average, there is a wider amount of variability in male characteristics than in females. This suggests there are enough of both males more suited for short-term relationships and those more suited for longer relationships.

== Criticism ==
Bellis and Baker calculated that if double-mating strategy does occur, the rate of paternal discrepancy would be between 6.9 and 13.8%. When taking kin selection into account, Gaulin, McBurney, and Brakeman-Wartell hypothesised that mother's side of family is more certain that the child is their kin and therefore invest more. Based on this matrilateral bias they calculated the rate of cuckoldry to be roughly 13% to 20%. These estimates were refuted by Y-chromosome tracking and HLA tracking that put the estimates between 1-2%. David Buss, prominent evolutionary psychologist, cited this evidence as a reason to be sceptical of dual-mating strategy hypothesis.

== See also ==
- Ovulatory shift hypothesis
- Human mating strategies
- Extra-pair copulation
- Sexual selection in humans
- Red Rose, White Rose (novella) - about a men having sexy Red Rose as girlfriend and pure White Rose as wife
- Dual strategies theory
- Greater male variability hypothesis
