= Sexual selection in humans =

Evolutionary effects of sexual selection on humans

Mutation and selection

The concept of sexual selection was introduced by Charles Darwin as an element of his theory of natural selection. Sexual selection is a biological way one sex chooses a mate for the best reproductive success. Most compete with others of the same sex for the best mate to contribute their genome for future generations. This has shaped human evolution for many years, but reasons why humans choose their mates are not fully understood. Sexual selection is quite different in non-human animals than humans as they feel more of the evolutionary pressures to reproduce and can easily reject a mate. The role of sexual selection in human evolution has not been firmly established although neoteny has been cited as being caused by human sexual selection. It has been suggested that sexual selection played a part in the evolution of the anatomically modern human brain, i.e. the structures responsible for social intelligence underwent positive selection as a sexual ornamentation to be used in courtship rather than for survival itself, and that it has developed in ways outlined by Ronald Fisher in the Fisherian runaway model. Fisher also stated that the development of sexual selection was "more favourable" in humans.

== General hypotheses ==
Some hypotheses about the evolution of the human brain argue that it is a sexually selected trait, as it would not confer enough fitness in itself relative to its high maintenance costs (a fifth to a quarter of the energy and oxygen consumed by a human). Current consensus about the evolutionary development of the human brain accepts sexual selection as a potential contributing factor but maintains that human intelligence and the ability to store and share cultural knowledge would have likely carried high survival value as well.

Sexual selection's role in human evolution cannot be definitively established, as features may result from an equilibrium among competing selective pressures, some involving sexual selection, others natural selection, and others pleiotropy. Richard Dawkins argued that

"When you notice a characteristic of an animal and ask what its Darwinian survival value is, you may be asking the wrong question. It could be that the characteristic you have picked out is not the one that matters. It may have "come along for the ride", dragged along in evolution by some other characteristic to which it is pleiotropically linked."

== Darwin's sexual selection hypothesis ==
Charles Darwin described sexual selection as depending on "the advantage which certain individuals have over others of the same sex and species, solely in respect of reproduction". Darwin noted that sexual selection is of two kinds and concluded that both kinds had operated on humans: "The sexual struggle is of two kinds; in the one it is between the individuals of the same sex, generally the male sex, in order to drive away or kill their rivals, the females remaining passive; whilst in the other, the struggle is likewise between the individuals of the same sex, in order to excite or charm those of the opposite sex, generally the females, which no longer remain passive, but select the more agreeable partners."

Charles Darwin conjectured that the male beard, as well as the hairlessness of humans compared to nearly all other mammals, were results of sexual selection. He reasoned that since the bodies of females are more nearly hairless, the loss of fur was due to sexual selection of females at a remote prehistoric time when males had overwhelming selective power, and that it nonetheless affected males due to genetic correlation between the sexes. He also hypothesized that contrasts in sexual selection acting along with natural selection were significant factors in the geographical differentiation in human appearance of some isolated groups, as he did not believe that natural selection alone provided a satisfactory answer. Although not explicit, his observation that in Khoisan women "the posterior part of the body projects in a most wonderful manner" (known as steatopygia) implies sexual selection for this characteristic. In The Descent of Man, and Selection in Relation to Sex, Darwin viewed many physical traits which vary around the world as being so trivial to survival that he concluded some input from sexual selection was required to account for their presence. He noted that variation in these features among the various peoples of the world meant human mate-choice criteria would also have to be quite different if the focus was similar, and he himself doubted that, citing reports indicating that ideals of beauty did not, in fact, vary in this way around the world.

== Sexual dimorphism ==
The effects on the human brain formation during puberty is directly linked to hormones changes. The mismatch timing between biological puberty and age of social maturity in western society has a psychological expectation on children. With puberty, men are generally hairier than women, and Darwin was of the opinion that hairlessness was related to sexual selection; however, several other explanations have been advanced to explain human hairlessness; a leading one being that loss of body hair facilitated sweating. This idea closely relates to that of the suggested need for increased photoprotection and is part of the most-commonly-accepted scientific explanation for the evolution of pigmentary traits.

Sexual dimorphism suggests the presence of sexual selection. The earliest homininae were highly dimorphic and that this tendency lessened over the course of human evolution, suggesting humans have become more monogamous. In contrast, gorillas living in harems exhibit a much stronger sexual dimorphism (see: homininae).

=== Sexual anatomy ===
The theory of sexual selection has been used to explain a number of human anatomical features. These include rounded breasts, facial hair, pubic hair and penis size. The breasts of primates are flat, yet are able to produce sufficient milk for feeding their young. The breasts of non-lactating human females are filled with fatty tissue and not milk. Thus it has been suggested the rounded female breasts are signals of fertility. Richard Dawkins has speculated that the loss of the penis bone in humans, when it is present in other primates, may be due to sexual selection by females looking for a clear sign of good health in prospective mates. Since a human erection relies on a hydraulic pumping system, erection failure is a sensitive early warning of certain kinds of physical and mental ill health.

Homo has a thicker penis than the other great apes, though it is on average no longer than the chimpanzee's. It has been suggested the evolution of the human penis towards larger size was the result of female choice rather than sperm competition, which generally favors large testicles. However, penis size may have been subject to natural selection, rather than sexual selection, due to a larger penis' efficiency in displacing the sperm of rival males during sexual intercourse. A model study showed displacement of semen was directly proportional to the depth of pelvic thrusting, as an efficient semen displacement device.

== Selection preferences and biological drivers ==
Several factors drive sexual selection in humans. Selection preferences are biologically driven, that is, by the display of phenotypic traits that can be both consciously and unconsciously evaluated by the opposite sex to determine the health and fertility of a potential mate. This process can be affected, however, by social factors, including in cultures where arranged marriage is practiced, or psychosocial factors, such as valuing certain cultural traits of a mate, including a person's social status, or what is perceived to be an ideal partner in various cultures.

=== Selection preferences in females ===
Some of the factors that affect how females select their potential mates for reproduction include voice pitch, facial shape, muscular appearance, and particularly height; with the possibility of a Fisherian runaway in the making.

Several studies suggest that there is a link between hormone levels and partner selection among humans. In a study measuring female attraction to males with varying levels of masculinity, it was established that women had a general masculinity preference for men's voices, and that the preference for masculinity was greater in the fertile phase of the menstrual cycle than in the non-fertile phase. There is further evidence from the same study that in fertile stages of the menstrual cycle, women also had a preference for other masculine traits such as body size, facial shape, and dominant behavior, which are indicators of both fertility and health. This study did not exclude males with feminine traits from being selected, however, as feminine traits in men indicate a higher probability of long-term relationship commitment, and may be one of several evolutionary strategies. Further research also backs up the idea of using phenotypic traits as a means of assessing a potential mate's fitness for reproduction as well as assessing whether a partner has high genetic quality.

One study proposed a link between Human Development Index levels and female preference for male facial appearance. While women from the United Kingdom preferred the faces of men with low cortisol levels, women from Latvia did not discriminate between men with either high or low levels of cortisol. It was concluded that societal-level ecological factors impact the valuation of traits by combinations of sex- and stress-hormones.

A 2020 study reported that women tend to find a man more attractive if the man's previous relationships ended mutually, and less attractive if the man was dumped.

=== Selection preferences in males ===
Like their female counterparts, males also use visual information about a potential mate, as well as voice, body shape, and an assortment of other factors in selecting a partner. Research shows that males tend to prefer feminine women's faces and voices as opposed to women with masculine features in these categories. Furthermore, males also evaluate skin coloration, symmetry, and apparent health, as a means by which they select a partner for reproductive purposes. Males are particularly attracted to femininity in women's faces when their testosterone levels are at their highest, and the level of attraction to femininity may fluctuate as hormone levels fluctuate. Studies on men have also been done to show the effects of exogenous testosterone and its effects on attraction to femininity, and the results concluded that throughout several studies, men have shown decreased preference for feminine female faces in the long-term context, when given exogenous testosterone, but this difference did not occur with placebo.

=== Common preferences in either sex ===
Sexual selection is in essence a process which favors sexual displays for attraction, aggressiveness, dominance, size, and strength, and the ability to exclude competitors by force if necessary, or by using resources to win. Both male and female use voice, face, and other physical characteristics to assess a potential mate's ability to reproduce, as well as their health. Together with visual and chemical signals, these crucial characteristics which are likely to enhance the ability to produce offspring, as well as long-term survival prospects, can be assessed and selections made.

== Sexual selection in males ==
=== Contest competition ===
Contest competition is a form of sexual selection in which mating is obtained by using force or the threat of force to exclude same-sex competitors from mates. Male contest competition favors large body size, which is seen in the sexual dimorphism of human males and females. In all living hominid species, males are more muscular, allowing them to have more strength and power. Human males have 61% more overall muscle mass compared to females. This greater muscle mass allows males to gain greater acceleration, speed, and more powerful striking movements. Compared to females, human males exhibit more same-sex aggression, which peaks in young adulthood.

Male contest competition also often favors threat displays, which allow one competitor to submit without a costly fight. Low vocalization fundamental frequencies (perceived as vocal pitch) increase the perception of threat among human males. Controlling for body size, lower male fundamental frequency relative to females tends to evolve in polygynous anthropoid primates, where males compete more intensely for mates. Chimpanzees and humans have the greatest sexual dimorphism in fundamental frequency of all hominids. Males are also more likely to engage in physical risks in front of competitors, and males who take more physical risks are perceived as being stronger. Status badges such as facial hair are generally related to men being perceived as more dominant. Facial hair makes the jaw appear more prominent and shows emotions like anger clearly which makes a male appear more threatening. Dominance has been associated with increased male mating success.

Often contest competition produces anatomical weapons such as antlers or large canine teeth; however, hominids lack canine weaponry typical of other primates. Reduced canine size may be due to bipedalism and adaptations of the hand. Bipedalism is not a common trait, yet many species like the great apes stand on their hind legs when fighting, which increases power behind blows. Hominin hands are adapted for gripping tools or hurling objects like stones. Bipedalism and utilizing handheld objects such as weapons may have aided early hominins in contest competition, reducing sexual selection pressures of maintaining large canine teeth.

Several other traits in human males may have been selected for contest competition. Males exhibit a more robust face compared to females. This may have provided protection against blows to the face during contest competitions as the areas on the skull that have increased robusticity are parts that are more likely to suffer from injury. Additionally, there are 23% more lefthanded males than females. Although left-handedness is heritable and associated with survival disadvantages, the rarity of left-handedness may have given ancestral males a fighting advantage in competitions keeping this trait in the gene pool via negative frequency-dependent selection. Many combat sports such as boxing have higher-than-chance frequencies of left-handed individuals among the top competitors. Human males are also able to tolerate pain longer than females, especially during competition. A higher pain tolerance allows for males to remain aggressive during contests along with an increased aerobic capacity. Males have an oxygen capacity rate that is 25–30% higher than females. This aerobic capacity increases during puberty when males are sexually maturing and preparing to mate.

Human males engage in both within-group contest competition and coalitional aggression. The latter form competition may be supported by males tending to contribute more to a group task when competing against other groups and to discriminate more strongly against outgroup members.

Traits that evolve during contest competition, such as large body size and physical aggression, are often costly to produce and maintain. These traits may therefore be indicators of male genetic quality and/or ability to provide resources and other direct benefits. Consequently, human females may evolve preferences for these traits, which then comprise an additional selection pressure. However, secondary sexual characteristics in human males do not always enhance overall attractiveness to females. Some traits of human males that function in contests, such as body size, strength, and weaponry usage, may also have been selected to aid in hunting. However, contest competition is observed in all great apes and thus likely preceded hunting as a selective pressure.

== Sexual selection in females ==
Human female mating competition is complex and multifaceted and varies across cultures, societies, and individuals. Females may compete for high-quality mates who possess traits that indicate underlying genetic quality, possibly including physical attractiveness and intelligence, or material resources that can enhance the survival and reproductive success of the female and her offspring.

Females may also compete for leadership and reputation in social alliances and networks that can provide support, protection, and mating opportunities. Human females compete with other females, sometimes including co-wives, to obtain and retain investment from mates, while managing cooperative same-sex relationships.

=== Female mate competition ===
Over human evolution, the cost of aggressive and physical contests in females may have been high given that females were the primary caregivers and protectors of offspring, so a mother's death greatly impacts infant mortality. Some behaviors from mothers competing with other females at a similar life stage over resources include self-promotion and competitor derogation. However, maternal competition remains understudied. Compared to male aggression, female aggression tends to be more indirect. Females tend to engage in more subtle and indirect aggression, such as gossip, as a competitive tool to harm same-sex rivals' social opportunities and partake in competitor derogation to prevent female rivals from getting male attention. Gossip, derogation, and social exclusion grant the aggressor the chance to go undetected and avoid retaliation. Derogation, for example, can eliminate same-sex rivals by reducing their ability to compete; it was found that girls' suicide attempts were associated with any amount of indirect peer victimization, whereas only frequent indirect peer victimization was associated with boys' suicide attempts. Furthermore, same-sex harassment in some nonhuman animals impacted females' ovulation capabilities, which suggests that human females' reproductive success could be influenced by the stress induced by indirect or direct peer victimization. Males pursue both sexually attractive and faithful long-term partners, which might be the source of female mating competition greatly revolving around denigrating same-sex rivals' attractiveness and reputation through accusations of promiscuity and infidelity. Competitive women are more likely to spread reputation-harming information about other women, suggesting that reputation manipulation is a form of female competition for romantic partners. Women are more likely to compete for desirable mates when maternal investment levels are high, and their social groups are largely composed of mothers, as more women living closer together are looking for similar resources that benefit their own survival and that of their children.

=== Sexually selected female traits ===
Competition for mates among human females may take multiple forms. Contests tend to be less frequent, aggressive, and injurious than male-male contests. This leads to a difference in the traits selected. The indirect aggression in which females engage can take the form of damaging the reputation of other women (e.g., via gossip), potentially influencing their sexual behavior and opportunities. Additionally, females compete with one another through male mate choice, e.g., by enhancing their own physical attractiveness. Some female anatomical traits are targets of male mate choice and possibly represent female sexual ornaments shaped by selection. Femininity in the female face and voice provide cues to female reproductive hormones and reproductive potential. Males tend to have lower pitched voices than females, likely due to male intrasexual competition, but some evidence suggests that high female voice pitch may also be favored by male mate choice and function in intrasexual competition among females.

Deposition of fat on the hips, buttocks, and breasts in human females may also be an outcome of female sexual selection, signaling the ability to support gestation and lactation for offspring in environments where resources may be low. However, in the Western World, women with larger breasts are seen as more likely to commit infidelity and more likely to participate in intra-sexual competition with other females. Greater overall body fat percentage in human females appears to be unique among primates and may function in storing resources needed to gestate and support large-brained offspring as well as in sexual selection. For example, higher female body mass index (BMI) is associated with increased fertility in young women, particularly those in subsistence societies. Lower WHR, lower BMI, and smaller waist sizes are also associated with lower birth weights and higher infant mortality. Such traits, particularly body fat distribution, may represent sexual ornamentation, which is important in mating throughout the animal kingdom, for example, in birds. Humans also use bodily decoration, including jewelry, tattoos, scarification, and makeup to enhance appearance and desirability to potential mates.

It has also been suggested that women who are nearing ovulation were more likely to be judged as more attractive than their counterparts who were in different stages of their cycle. Facial and vocal attractiveness have been observed to change with estradiol and progesterone in pattens consistent with fertility-related increases, although some data challenge this interpretation. In general, ovulatory cycle changes are more subtle than in non-human primates, perhaps representing leakage of information on fertility and hormonal status rather than signals functioning to convey this information.

== Phenotype ==
John Manning suggests that where polygyny is common, there is also a higher disease burden, resulting in selection for antimicrobial resistance. In this view, the antimicrobial properties of melanin help mitigate the susceptibility to disease in sub-Saharan Africa. According to this argument, the anti-infective qualities of melanin were more important than protection from ultraviolet light in the evolution of the darkest skin types. Manning asserts that skin color is more correlated with the occurrence of polygyny – because melanin has an antimicrobial function – than the latitudinal gradient in intensity of ultraviolet radiation.

Research seems to contradict Manning's explanation about skin color. The analysis of indigenous populations from more than 50 countries has shown that the strongest correlation with light skin is upper latitude. Rogers et al. (2004) concluded that dark skin evolved as a result of the loss of body hair among the earliest primate ancestors of humans. and protect from folate depletion due to the increased exposure to sunlight. When humans started to migrate away from the tropics, where there is less-intense sunlight, lighter skin is able to generate more vitamin D than darker skin, so it would have represented a health benefit in reduced sunlight, leading to natural selection for lighter skin.

Anthropologist Peter Frost has proposed that sexual selection for women with unusual hair or eye color was responsible for the evolution of pigmentary traits in European populations, however this theory has since been refuted by data-based evidence from genetics and spectrophotometry

== Geoffrey Miller hypothesis ==
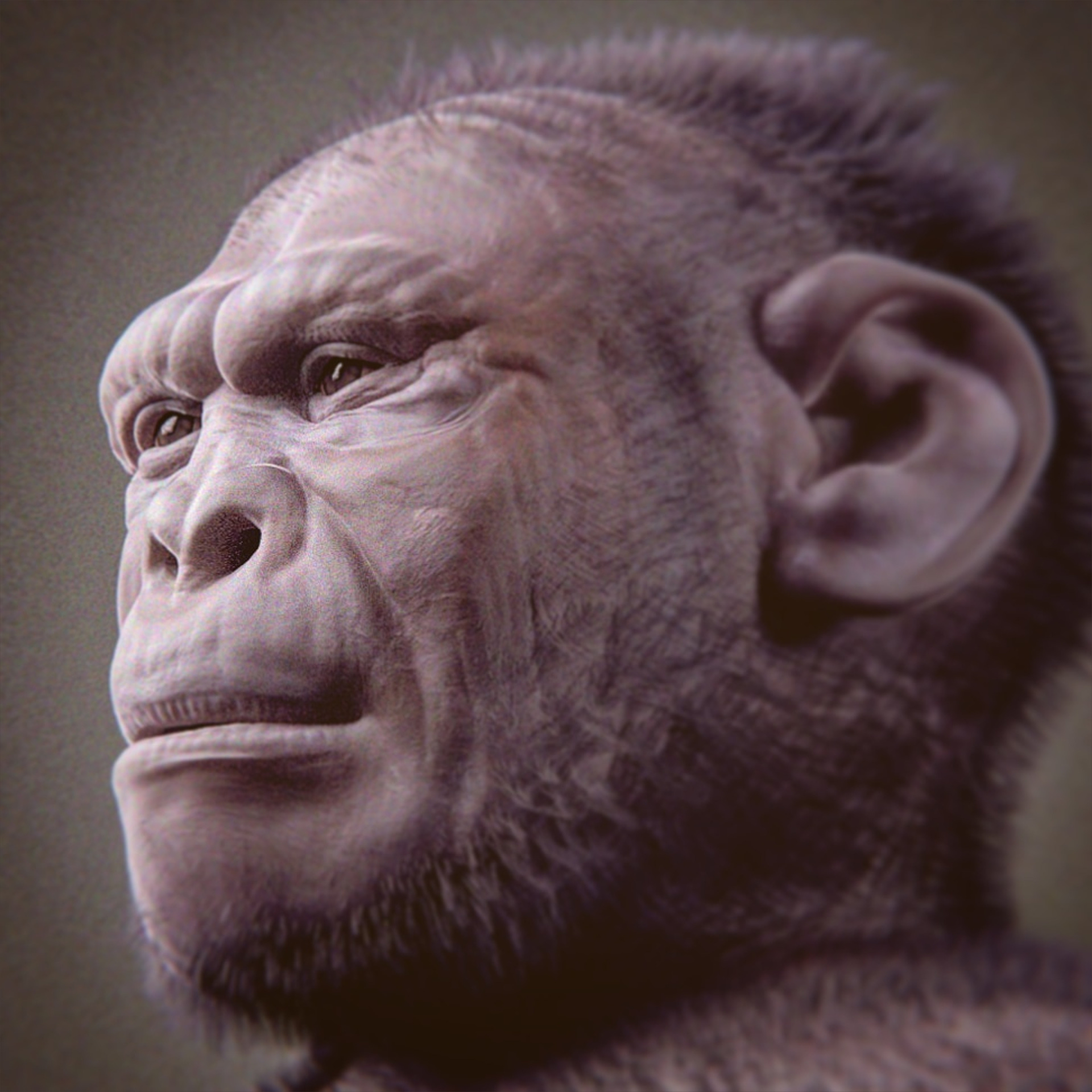
Homo habilis – forensic facial reconstruction

Geoffrey Miller, drawing on some of Darwin's largely neglected ideas about human behavior, has hypothesized that many human behaviors not clearly tied to survival benefits, such as humor, music, visual art, some forms of altruism, verbal creativity, or the fact that most humans have a far greater vocabulary than that which is required for survival, can nevertheless play a role. Miller (2000) has proposed that this apparent redundancy is due to individuals using vocabulary to demonstrate their intelligence, and consequently their "fitness", to potential mates. This has been tested experimentally, and it appears that males do make greater use of lower-frequency (more unusual) words when in a romantic mindset compared to a non-romantic mindset, suggesting that vocabulary is likely to be used as a sexual display (Rosenberg & Tunney, 2008). All these qualities are considered courtship adaptations that have been favored through sexual selection.

Miller is critical of theories that imply that human culture arose as accidents or by-products of human evolution. He believes that human culture arose through sexual selection for creative traits. In that view, many human artifacts could be considered subject to sexual selection as part of the extended phenotype, for instance clothing that enhances sexually selected traits. During human evolution, on at least two occasions, hominid brain size increased rapidly over a short period of time followed by a period of stasis. The first period of brain expansion occurred 2.5 million years ago, when Homo habilis first began using stone tools. The second period occurred 500,000 years ago, with the emergence of archaic Homo sapiens. Miller argues that the rapid increases in brain size would have occurred by a positive feedback loop resulting in a Fisherian runaway selection for larger brains. Tor Nørretranders, in The Generous Man conjectures how intelligence, musicality, artistic and social skills, and language might have evolved as an example of the handicap principle, analogously with the peacock's tail, the standard example of that principle.

== Opposing arguments ==
The role of sexual selection in human evolution has been considered controversial from the moment of publication of Darwin's book on sexual selection (1871). Among his vocal critics were some of Darwin's supporters, such as Alfred Wallace, a believer in spiritualism and a non-material origin of the human mind, who argued that animals and birds do not choose mates based on sexual selection, and that the artistic faculties in humans belong to their spiritual nature and therefore cannot be connected to natural selection, which only affects the animal nature. Darwin was accused of looking to the evolution of early human ancestors through the moral codes of the 19th century Victorian society.

== See also ==
- Human mating strategies
- Hypergamy
- Marriage squeeze
- Parental investment in humans
- Strategic pluralism
