= Dual strategies theory =

Theory in evolutionary psychology and anthropology

In evolutionary psychology and evolutionary anthropology, dual strategies theory states that humans can increase their status in social hierarchies using two major strategies known as dominance and prestige.

- The first and oldest of the two strategies, dominance, is exemplified by the use of force, implied force or other forms of coercion to take social power.
- The second of the two strategies, prestige, is defined as an approach in which an individual gains social rank through demonstrating traits valued by other group members such as high levels of skill, generosity or the ability to teach their skills to others.

It has been suggested that rather than represent two unique strategies, dominance and prestige should be seen as two distinct groups of strategies with different sub-strategies within each of the two major categories. While distinct, the two strategies both enable people to gain social standing and maintain it over time. The distinction between the two is that social rank from prestige is freely conferred by group members which is not the case with dominance.

== History ==
Henrich and Gil-White built on social exchange theory to develop the idea of prestige as conveyed social status and respect in exchange for expertise. This was contrasted with dominance where social status is taken rather than freely conveyed. The two strategies are distinct pathways from each other but both equally viable routes to gain status in human social hierarchies.

== Dominance ==
The oldest of the two strategies, Dominance is identified with a desire for authority, control, and power. It is associated with tactics that include the use of force, threat, selfish withholding of resources and general intimidation. Dominance is a status gaining strategy that has been observed in many species including primates and particularly chimpanzees who are one of the closest primate species genetically to humans. In humans, dominance is also associated with negative personality traits such as hubristic pride less focus on others, and a reduction in prosocial behaviors. Dominance is less stable than prestige in humans as followers can resist and coordinate to reduce or suppress the dominant leader's power.

== Prestige ==
Prestige is identified with a desire for the admiration, respect, and elevated status. It is associated with tactics that include freely sharing desirable traits, expertise, collaboration, and moral grandstanding in order to gain higher social status. Prestige is linked to positive traits such as authentic pride. Prestige appears to be unique to humans and the development of prestige is linked to the development of larger and more intricate social structures. Prestige-based leadership is more stable and long term as it produces mutually beneficial outcomes for followers and the leader.

== Domain specificity ==
Dominance and prestige hierarchies both appear to be naturally occurring in human groups. The status gained is domain specific and may not be transferable across different activities. In particular, there is a marked preference for allocating prestige based on specific domain expertise suggesting that status earned on prestige grounds is specific to the domain in which it was earned and largely not transferable to other domains.

== Examples ==
=== Emotion ===
The dual strategies theory explores how individuals navigate social hierarchies using two main approaches: dominance and prestige. These strategies have profound implications for human emotions. Individuals who employ dominance tend to evoke emotions of fear and subordination in others, often through aggressive or coercive behaviors. In contrast, those who seek prestige inspire respect and admiration, frequently by demonstrating valued skills, knowledge, or competencies. These different strategies not only influence how others perceive and respond to individuals but also shape the emotions of the individuals themselves, with dominants potentially feeling more anger and control, while those seeking prestige experience more gratification and pride upon gaining social recognition. Additionally, status instability in social hierarchies is crucial for understanding this variability in emotional responses.

=== Consumption ===
Relative to prestige based hierarchies, dominance based hierarchies tend to increase consumer preference for displays of conspicuous consumption making a clear link between status seeking behavior and consumer spending. This preference for conspicuous consumption by those in a more dominance based hierarchy is linked to the increased social anxiety that dominance based hierarchies create.

=== Mating ===
Analogous to male-dominated hierarchies in other species of primates, human women prefer to mate with high-status human men; resulting in men of higher status gaining more sexual access to women compared to men of lower status. This has contributed to the existence of polygyny around the world all throughout human history, a mating system which typically consists of high-status men such as kings, emperors, and tribal chiefs being married to multiple wives or having sexual relations with multiple concubines. In modern Westernized societies that embrace monogamy, high-status men take advantage of their increased sexual access to women in the form of cheating, multiple short-term sex partners, or serial marriages. In various studies, married men who score higher on social dominance admit to having more extramarital affairs. The link between a man's social status and his sexual access to women has remained highly consistent throughout human history despite changes in culture and civilization, which suggests a powerful evolutionary pressure behind the tendency of men to engage in status-seeking behavior more frequently than women.

Men with higher incomes and status tend to have more frequent sex and a higher number of children. A 2012 study found that men in supervisory positions in businesses had more children compared to their subordinates. Even within universities, a 2005 study found that male academics with high status positions had more children compared to other male employees.

Gangs are predominately male social groups organized as hierarchies that consist of members defending territory or controlling resources, often for illegal purposes. Gangs often come into violent conflict with other gangs. Gang members who display ferocity in battles with enemy gangs often experience an increase in their social status. The possibility of gaining sexual access to women may be a significant motivator for young men to join gangs. In a 1991 study, evolutionary psychologists Craig Palmer and Christopher Tilley found that male gang members reported a significantly higher number of sex partners compared to men who were not members of gangs, with some gang members reporting more sex partners during a single month compared to the average same-age man over the entire course of a year. Male leaders of gangs reported the highest amount of sex partners.

There is a distinction between women's preferences for men who have gained their high status through dominance, and men who have gained their high status through prestige. Women prefer dominant men for short-term sexual affairs, and prestigious men for long-term romantic relationships. Dominant men display signs of possessing high-quality genes and thus potentially producing genetically healthy offspring, often resulting in women viewing them as being desirable for immediate sexual intercourse. However, dominant men are often unreliable as stable long-term providers and romantic partners. Prestigious men are reliable long-term providers and romantic partners, but often lack signs of possessing high-quality genes and are thus often less desirable for immediate sexual intercourse. This represents a trade-off for women known as strategic pluralism, in which women must find an optimum between the dominance and prestige of high-status men.

=== Punishment ===
Both dominance and prestige interact with punishment and being punished by group members in various bidirectional ways. High status dominant leaders are punished more severely for transgressions against group and organizational norms than high status prestige types for the same or similar offenses. Whereas, the ability and willingness to punish others in a group increases perceptions of the punisher's dominance among other group members making punishing others a strategic tool but one which is only open to high status individuals. The costs associated with punishing others are less for high status individuals who end up with their reputation and dominant status enhanced from being seen by the group to punish others so the motive to punish others can be driven by self interest.

=== Group management ===
Both dominance and prestige interact with group management bidirectionally. Dominant leaders are more likely to attempt to stay close to group members that they see as potential threats to their power in order to monitor and control them. This behavior is less likely to occur if the dominant leader does not feel that their position is under threat. Similarly, leaders high in dominance whose position is under internal threat may prioritize retaining power over the interests of the group through tactics such as withholding information from the group, excluding able subordinates who are potential rivals, and preventing skilled group members from having influence over group tasks. In the face of external or out-group threat high dominance leaders stop prioritizing self interest over group goals and these behaviors cease. Dominance based leaders do use other social influence tactics rather than exclusively coercive and have a range of complaisant tactics often as part of a general divide and conquer strategy such as selectively building relationships and using reason to convince some targeted subordinates. When feeling threatened, dominance based leaders can generate divisions and work against cooperation among subordinates and undermine efficient group functioning in order to preserve leader status and power. The tactics used to damage own group cohesion include leaders restricting the amount of communication among subordinates, physically isolating skilled subordinates, and preventing subordinates from bonding with one another. This behavior was targeted at highly skilled subordinates who were seen as potential rivals to the leader. This dominant leader tendency to attack own group cohesion was removed when the threat to the leader was removed. In direct response to the coercive and unethical behavior of dominant style leaders, there is some evidence that employees, under certain circumstances, will take collective action to minimize the impact or even dethrone dominant style leaders.

Prestige based leaders are more likely to prioritize decisions preferred by followers rather than what they feel is the best course of action for group performance, suggesting that prestige leaders can prioritize social approval from the group instead of overall group performance. As prestige based leaders are more dependent on group support they show signs of hyper-vigilance towards signs of social discontent and disapproval from followers through increased visual attention and face perception which in turn leads to attempts to maintain social relationships with followers. This is consistent with evidence that prestige based approaches are positively associated with complaisant or people pleasing tactics but negatively associated with coercive tactics.

=== Risk taking ===
People endorse risk-takers as leaders in competitive intergroup situations but not in cooperative intergroup settings. Risk takers are perceived as more dominant and risk-taking is associated with leadership. Risk-taking organization members are more likely to be granted leadership positions which in turn explains how some organizations develop a risk taking culture.

=== Populism and political discontent ===
Increased societal inequality leads to heightened needs for status and dominance seeking behavior through individual or coalition aggression as dominance for certain groups is a more attainable route to status than prestige. While both dominance and prestige are viable routes for attaining influential leadership positions, economic uncertainty leads to individual voters feeling a lack of personal control which in turn results in greater preference for more dominant leaders in times of economic uncertainty. Therefore preferences for dominant leadership styles arise from a context full of intergroup conflict, innate preferences for dominant leaders as well as popular commitment towards pursuing group-based conflict in order to establish societal dominance through aggressive and offensive strategies.

=== Physical communication of status ===
High social rank attained either through dominance or prestige is associated with distinct facial expressions, head positions and bodily expansion. An example of this is that prestige based leaders signal their status with an upwards head tilt versus a downward head tilt for dominance based leaders. Humans use voice changes to signal status relationships with deepening vocal pitch during peer interactions indicating higher social rank. In times of inter-group conflict or warfare there is often a preference for leaders with dominant, masculine looking faces with the reverse being the case during peacetime.

=== Leadership as a possible third evolved strategy ===
There is some evidence that a third distinct evolved motivation pathway explaining the drive towards higher status exists, a leadership motivation. This pathway can be summed up leaders motivated to lead people and organizations out of a sense of wider responsibility While distinct from dominance and prestige this leadership does share a similar desire for power with the dual strategies.

== Links with other theories ==
=== Servant leadership ===
There is an overlap between prestige and servant leadership but some important differences as well.

==== Similarities ====
Prestige-based leaders and servant leaders are more likely to make sacrifices for the welfare of their groups and work hard to benefit other group members.

==== Differences ====
Servant leadership does not imply the leader demonstrating competence as prestige does. Motivation is also a differentiating factor with servant leaders sacrificing for the group out of compassionate love whereas prestige based leaders may sacrifice in order to gain status from the group. Another key difference is that servant leadership is not linked to narcissism, whereas prestige leadership is linked to narcissism even if the prestige based leader is likely to suppress it in front of group members.

== Research methodologies and tools ==
=== Dominance and prestige scales ===
Dominance and prestige scales have been developed to research dominance and prestige. The scales are scored out of 7 and cover both a self-report and a peer-report scale.

== General applications ==
Dual strategies theory has been featured in publications aimed at practitioners and applied specifically to leadership and leadership behaviors, examples include applications for leadership and sub-fields within such as educational leadership. It has also featured in articles in publications aimed at the more general reader such as the New York Times.

== See also ==
- Dual-mating strategy
