= The Genetical Theory of Natural Selection =

Book by Ronald Aylmer Fisher

- First edition title page
- Author: Ronald Fisher
- Language: English
- Subject: Evolutionary biology
- Publisher: The Clarendon Press
- Publication date: 1930
- Publication place: United Kingdom
- OCLC: 18500548
- Dewey Decimal: 575.423
- LC Class: QH366 .F5
- Preceded by: Statistical Methods for Research Workers
- Followed by: The Design of Experiments

The Genetical Theory of Natural Selection is a book by Ronald Fisher which combines Mendelian genetics with Charles Darwin's theory of natural selection, with Fisher being the first to argue that "Mendelism therefore validates Darwinism" and stating with regard to mutations that "The vast majority of large mutations are deleterious; small mutations are both far more frequent and more likely to be useful", thus refuting orthogenesis. First published in 1930 by The Clarendon Press, it is one of the most important books of the modern synthesis, and helped define population genetics. It had been described by J. F. Crow as the "deepest book on evolution since Darwin".

It is commonly cited in biology books, outlining many concepts that are still considered important such as Fisherian runaway, Fisher's principle, reproductive value, Fisher's fundamental theorem of natural selection, Fisher's geometric model, the sexy son hypothesis, mimicry and the evolution of dominance. It was dictated to his wife in the evenings as he worked at Rothamsted Research in the day.

== History ==
In the early 20th century, biologists were discussing on how to reconcile Mendelian genetics with Darwinian natural Section. In England, at this time Ronald Fisher was working at the Rothamsted Experimental, and he developed statistical ways to analyze inheritance and variation in experiments within agriculture. When he applied these methods to evolutionary problems, he showed how Mendelian inheritance could produce the continuous variation observed by Darwin mathematically. This unified selection and hereditary, with the guidance of natural selection, population and mutation. Fisher's book, The Genetical Theory of Selection (1930) emphasized the importance of sexual production and genetic recombination in evolution.

After the publication of his book, it was recognized by the theoretical biologists, and considered important in population genetics. Researchers like, J.B.S. Haldane and Sewall Wright expanded on Fisher's framework to describe gene frequencies, genetic drift and mutation. The book also influenced later architects of the modern synthesis, like Theodosius Dobzhansky, Ernst Mayr, and Julian Huxley. The book also contained chapters on human fertility and eugenics which was the reflection of what was socially accepted in the early 20th century in Britain. Scholars in recent years have re-evaluated these sections, and they noted that fisher's eugenic views may be outdated both scientifically and ethically. But his findings understood with the context of what time period it was written and his scientific contributions helped get to the current findings and is very important.

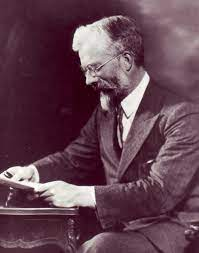
Ronald Fisher

== Contents ==
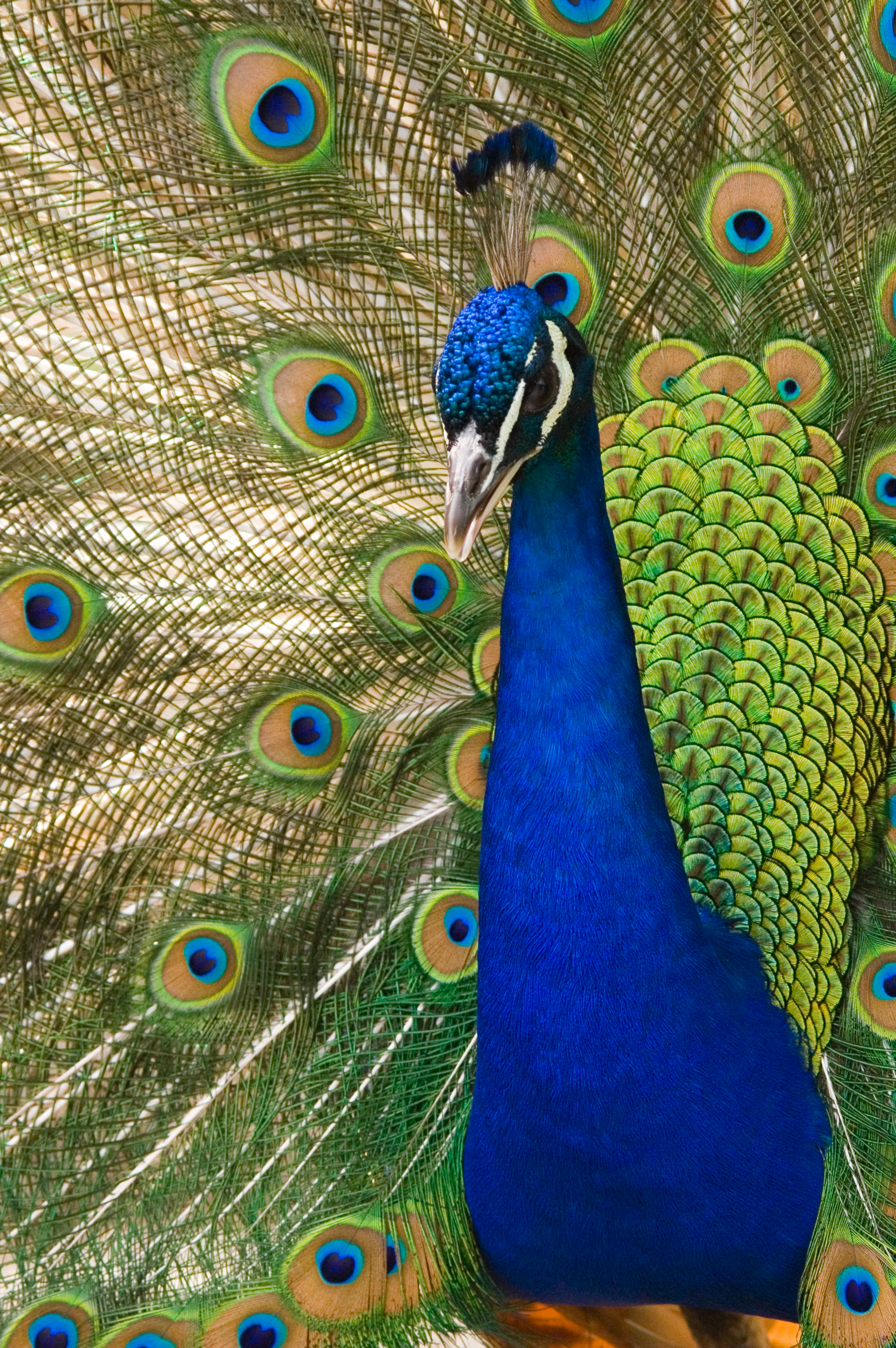
The peacock plumage is a classic example of the hypothesized Fisherian runaway.

In the preface, Fisher considers some general points, including that there must be an understanding of natural selection distinct from that of evolution, and that the then-recent advances in the field of genetics (see history of genetics) now allowed this. In the first chapter, Fisher considers the nature of inheritance, rejecting blending inheritance, because it would eliminate genetic variance, in favour of particulate inheritance. The second chapter introduces Fisher's fundamental theorem of natural selection. The third considers the evolution of dominance, which Fisher believed was strongly influenced by modifiers. Other chapters discuss parental investment, Fisher's geometric model, concerning how spontaneous mutations affect biological fitness, Fisher's principle which explains why the sex ratio between males and females is almost always 1:1, reproductive value, examining the demography of having girl children. Using his knowledge of statistics, the Fisherian runaway, which explores how sexual selection can lead to a positive feedback runaway loop, producing features such as the peacock's plumage. He also wrote about the evolution of dominance, which explores genetic dominance.

=== Eugenics ===
The last five chapters (8-12) include Fisher's concern about dysgenics and proposals for eugenics. Fisher attributed the fall of civilizations to the fertility of their upper classes being diminished, and used British 1911 census data to show an inverse relationship between fertility and social class, partly due, he claimed, to the lower financial costs and hence increasing social status of families with fewer children. He proposed the abolition of extra allowances to large families, with the allowances proportional to the earnings of the father. He served in several official committees to promote eugenics. In 1934, he resigned from the Eugenics Society over a dispute about increasing the power of scientists within the movement.

== Editions ==
A second, slightly revised edition was republished in 1958. In 1999, a third variorum edition (ISBN 0-19-850440-3), with the original 1930 text, annotated with the 1958 alterations, notes and alterations accidentally omitted from the second edition was published, edited by professor John Henry Bennett of the University of Adelaide.

== Biography ==
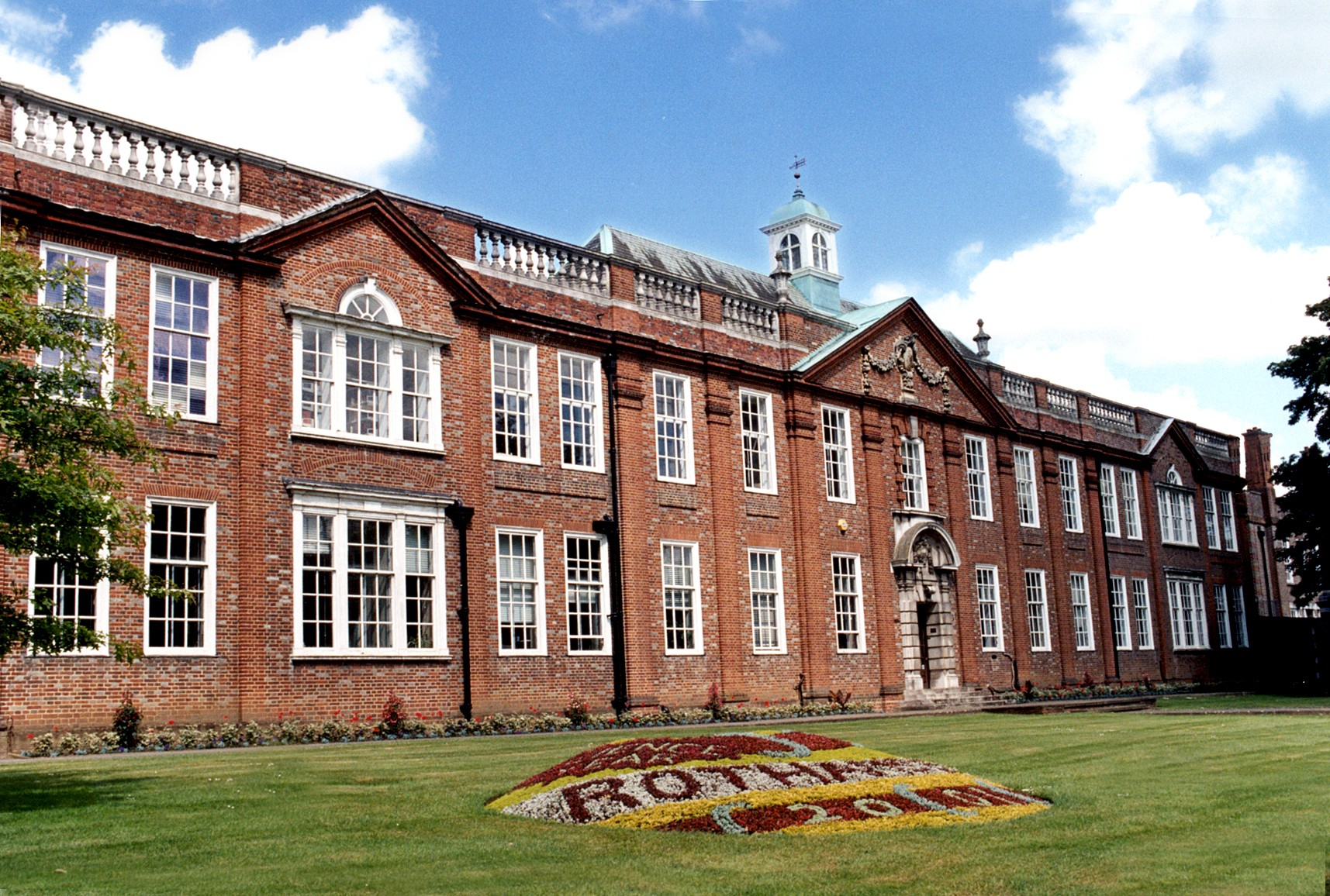
The Rothamsted Experimental Station, Harpenden, England, where Ronald A. Fisher worked during the 1920s and early 1930s while developing the ideas later published in The Genetical Theory of Natural Selection

In East Finchley, London, Ronald Aylmer Fisher was born on February 17, 1890. He was the youngest of eight children, including a twin, however, his twin brother passed away at infancy. Tragically, his mother passed away from peritonitis when he was fourteen, leaving his family in difficult circumstances during his early years. Fisher received his education at Harrow School, where he excelled in mathematics and science. Afterward, he obtained a scholarship to attend Gonville and Caius College, Cambridge where he graduated in 1912. He concentrated on mathematics while attending Cambridge, but eventually discovered that biology and statistics sparked his interest.

Following Cambridge, he concentrated on a number of research and academic roles. Fisher established the groundwork for modern statistical theory while employed as a statistician at Rothamsted Experimental Station in Hertfordshire from 1919 to 1933. Additionally, establishing the experiments that subsequently influenced agricultural biology and genetics. In 1933, he accepted the Galton Professorship of Eugenics at University College London, and ten years later was named the Arthur Balfour Professor of Genetics at Cambridge University.

Friendships and connections with influential biologists were among Fisher's discoveries. Fisher later acknowledged Darwin's influence by dedicating The Genetical Theory of Natural Selection to Major Leonard Darwin, Charles Darwin's son. According to biologist E. B. Ford, Fisher had a significant impact on biological methodology and theory. Ford wrote, “Fisher’s combination of mathematics, statistics, and genetics gave biology a quantitative backbone that was previously lacking” . According to Ford, Fisher's work was occasionally misinterpreted by his peers, but his depth and range of thought won him lasting respect. Following his retirement in 1957, Fisher moved to Adelaide, Australia, where he worked and published articles until his passing on July 29, 1962.

== Controversy ==
Scholars have long discussed Fisher's book The Genetical Theory of Natural Selection because of its comprehensive treatment of eugenics and social policy, despite the fact that it is praised for its groundbreaking findings and unique theories, making it an influential book. According to historian A. Aylward, the book's last five chapters are a reflection on eugenics and the decline of civilizations. The first portion of the book concentrates on the mathematical foundations of modern evolutionary theory, which are then applied to human civilization in the following chapters.

Fisher argued that disparities in fertility between different social classes were the cause of civilization's downfall. Government incentives to promote reproduction among those with higher socioeconomic positions were part of Fisher's proposals. Fisher's evolutionary theory is associated with the eugenic ideology of the early twentieth century, which is now considered discriminatory and pseudoscientific. These texts contain racial and classist assumptions that are at odds with modern ethics and genetics. According to Aylward, proponents have rejected these arguments as careless but ultimately meaningless ideas that have no bearing on the book's scientific validity.

Additionally, Aylward challenges traditional readings of the book's composition. Looking at the amended unpublished typescript from 1919, there are observations that numerous pages of the eugenics material are replicated exactly from this earlier draft. According to Aylward, the book is backwards since Fisher published the eugenics writings before he developed his genetic theory. This suggested that Fisher's political and social theories were conceptual foundations that influenced his research rather than being afterthoughts. This controversy has sparked discussion over how to understand Fisher's legacy, whether as a pioneer in science alone or as a person whose social philosophy and genetics were deeply intertwined.

== Legacy ==
The significant influence that Ronald A. Fisher had on genetics and heredity did not go unnoticed. He was a cornerstone that advanced the work of Charles Darwin by linking it to Mendelian genetics. Fisher's work also contributed to the development of many genetical studies, as his influence was great among scientists, making him a key figure in modern evolutionary biology. The Genetical Theory of Natural Selection also contained early interpretations of and ideas about multi-level selection, arguing that the development of sexual reproduction represented group selection advantaging a species while providing no advantage to an individual organism.

== Reviews ==
The book was reviewed by Charles Galton Darwin, who sent Fisher his copy of the book, with notes in the margin, starting a correspondence which lasted several years. The book also had a major influence on W. D. Hamilton's theories on the genetic basis of kin selection.

John Henry Bennett gave an account of the writing and reception of the book.

Sewall Wright, who had many disagreements with Fisher, reviewed the book and wrote that it was "certain to take rank as one of the major contributions to the theory of evolution." J. B. S. Haldane described it as "brilliant." Reginald Punnett was negative, however.

The book was largely overlooked for 40 years, and in particular Fisher's fundamental theorem of natural selection was misunderstood. The work had a great effect on W. D. Hamilton, who discovered it as an undergraduate at the University of Cambridge and noted in these excerpts from the rear cover of the 1999 variorum edition:

This is a book which, as a student, I weighed as of equal importance to the entire rest of my undergraduate Cambridge BA course and, through the time I spent on it, I think it notched down my degree. Most chapters took me weeks, some months;...And little modified even by molecular genetics, Fisher's logic and ideas still underpin most of the ever broadening paths by which Darwinism continues its invasion of human thought.

For a book that I rate only second in importance in evolution theory to Darwin's "Origin" (this as joined with its supplement "of Man"), and also rate as undoubtedly one of the greatest books of the twentieth century the appearance of a variorum edition is a major event....

Unlike in 1958, natural selection has become part of the syllabus of our intellectual life and the topic is certainly included in every decent course in biology. By the time of my ultimate graduation, will I have understood all that is true in this book and will I get a First? I doubt it. In some ways some of us have overtaken Fisher; in many, however, this brilliant, daring man is still far in front.

The publication of the variorum edition in 1999 led to renewed interest in the work and reviews by Laurence Cook, Brian Charlesworth, James F. Crow, and A. W. F. Edwards.

== Bibliography ==
- Bennett, J. H. (1983). Natural Selection, Heredity, and Eugenics: Including Selected Correspondence of R.A. Fisher with Leonard Darwin and Others. Oxford Science Publications. Oxford, UK; New York: Clarendon Press; Oxford University Press. ISBN 0-19-858177-7. LCCN 83004165. OCLC 9393205.
- Fisher, R. A. (1999) [1930]. The Genetical Theory of Natural Selection. Edited with a foreword and notes by J. H. Bennett (A complete variorum ed.). Oxford, UK: Oxford University Press. ISBN 0-19-850440-3. LCCN 00702764. OCLC 45308589.
- Grafen, Alan; Ridley, Mark, eds. (2006). Richard Dawkins: How a Scientist Changed the Way We Think. Oxford, UK; New York: Oxford University Press. ISBN 978-0-19-929116-8. LCCN 2005033395. OCLC 62322400.
- Haldane, J. B. S. (1932). The Causes of Evolution. London; New York: Longmans, Green & Co. LCCN 32033284. OCLC 5006266. "This book is based on a series of lectures delivered in January 1931 at the Prifysgol Cymru, Aberystwyth, and entitled 'A re-examination of Darwinism'."
