= Steven Gangestad =

American evolutionary psychologist

- Born: Steven Warren Gangestad
- Education: Stanford University; University of Minnesota
- Known for: Research on concealed ovulation in humans
- Scientific career
- Fields: Evolutionary psychology
- Institutions: University of New Mexico
- Thesis: On the etiology of individual differences in self-monitoring and expressive self-control: Testing the case of strong genetic influence (1986)

Steven Warren Gangestad is an American evolutionary psychologist who is Distinguished Professor Emeritus in the Department of Psychology at the University of New Mexico. With his University of New Mexico colleague Randy Thornhill, he has conducted considerable research pointing to the existence of concealed ovulation in humans.
