= Fisherian runaway =

Sexual selection mechanism

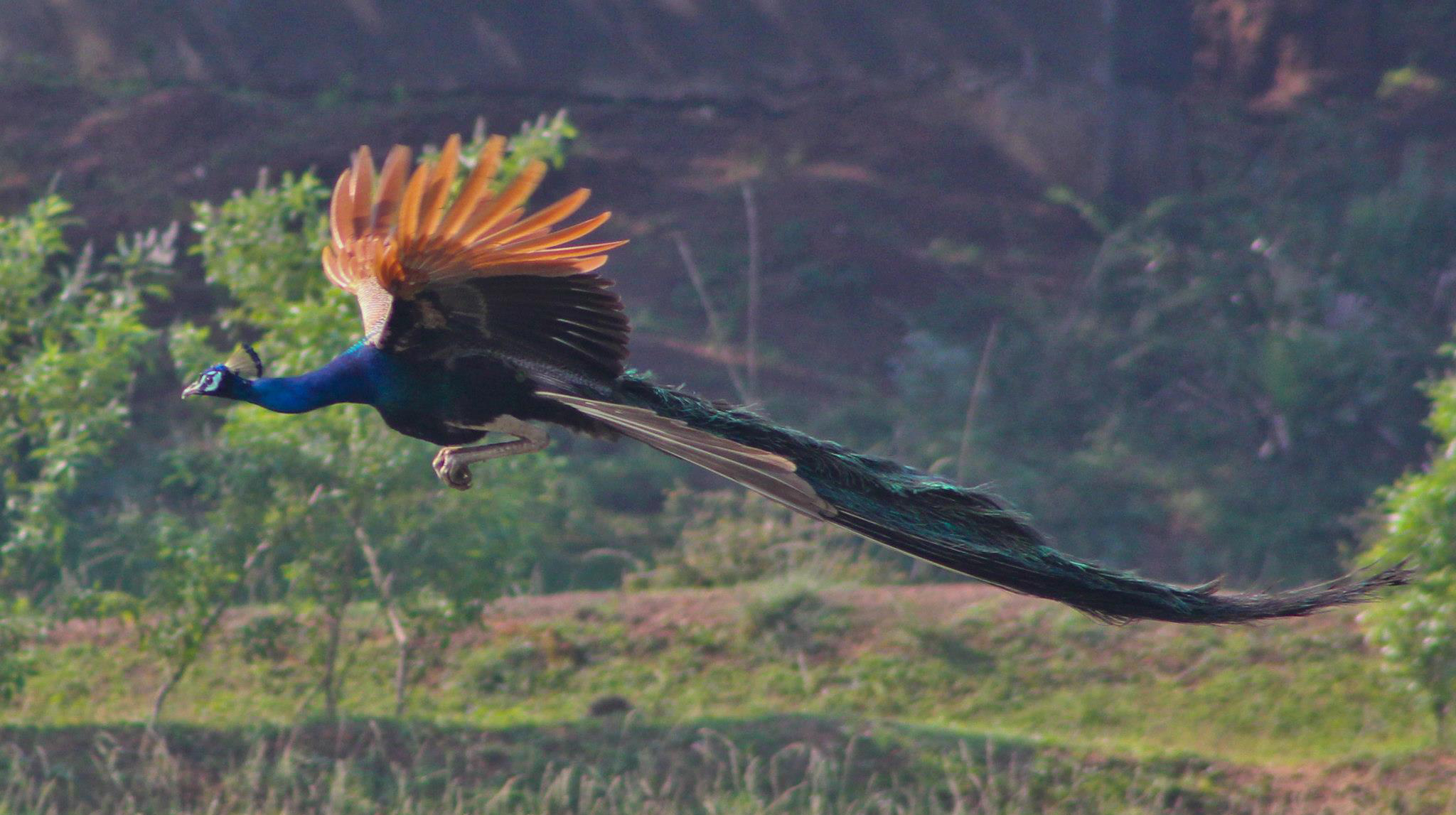
The peacock tail in flight, the classic example of an ornament assumed to be a Fisherian runaway

Fisherian runaway or runaway selection is a sexual selection mechanism proposed by the mathematical biologist Ronald Fisher in the early 20th century, to account for the evolution of ostentatious male ornamentation by persistent, directional female choice. An example is the colourful and elaborate peacock plumage compared to the relatively subdued peahen plumage; the costly ornaments, notably the bird's extremely long tail, appear to be incompatible with natural selection. Fisherian runaway can be postulated to include sexually dimorphic phenotypic traits such as behavior expressed by a particular sex.

Extreme and (seemingly) maladaptive sexual dimorphism represented a paradox for evolutionary biologists from Charles Darwin's time up to the modern synthesis. Darwin attempted to resolve the paradox by assuming heredity for both the preference and the ornament, and supposed an "aesthetic sense" in higher animals, leading to powerful selection of both characteristics in subsequent generations. Fisher developed the theory further by assuming genetic correlation between the preference and the ornament, that initially the ornament signalled greater potential fitness (the likelihood of leaving more descendants), so preference for the ornament had a selective advantage. Subsequently, if strong enough, female preference for exaggerated ornamentation in mate selection could be enough to undermine natural selection even when the ornament has become non-adaptive. Over subsequent generations this could lead to runaway selection by positive feedback, and the speed with which the trait and the preference increase could (until counter-selection interferes) increase exponentially.

Modern descriptions of the same mechanism using quantitative genetic and population genetic models were mainly established by Russell Lande and Mark Kirkpatrick in the 1980s, and are now more commonly referred to as the sexy son hypothesis.

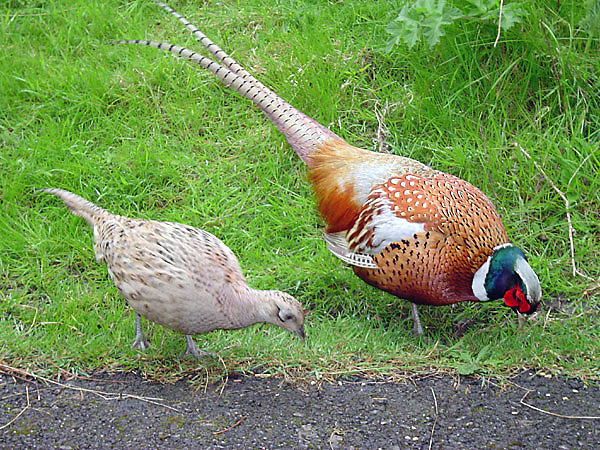
Female (left) and male (right) pheasant, a sexually dimorphic species

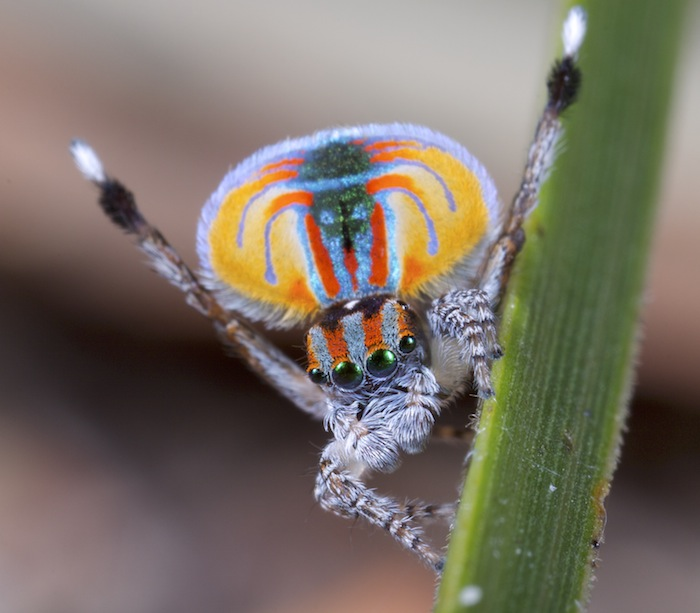
Peacock spider males perform courtship dances that display their boldly patterned chelicerae, legs, and abdomens. Females are cryptic brown.

== History ==
=== From Charles Darwin to Ronald Fisher ===
Charles Darwin published a book on sexual selection in 1871 called The Descent of Man, and Selection in Relation to Sex, which garnered interest upon its release but by the 1880s the ideas had been deemed too controversial and were largely neglected. Alfred Russel Wallace disagreed with Darwin, particularly after Darwin's death, that sexual selection was a real phenomenon.

Ronald Fisher was one of the few other biologists to engage with the question. When Wallace stated that animals show no sexual preference in his 1915 paper, The evolution of sexual preference, Fisher publicly disagreed:

The objection raised by Wallace ... that animals do not show any preference for their mates on account of their beauty, and in particular that female birds do not choose the males with the finest plumage, always seemed to the writer a weak one; partly from our necessary ignorance of the motives from which wild animals choose between a number of suitors; partly because there remains no satisfactory explanation either of the remarkable secondary sexual characters themselves, or of their careful display in love-dances, or of the evident interest aroused by these antics in the female; and partly also because this objection is apparently associated with the doctrine put forward by Sir Alfred Wallace in the same book, that the artistic faculties in man belong to his "spiritual nature", and therefore have come to him independently of his "animal nature" produced by natural selection.

— R.A. Fisher (1915)

Fisher, in the foundational 1930 book, The Genetical Theory of Natural Selection, first outlined a model by which runaway inter-sexual selection could lead to sexually dimorphic male ornamentation based upon female choice and a preference for "attractive" but otherwise non-adaptive traits in male mates. He suggested that selection for traits that increase fitness may be quite common:

Occasions may not be infrequent when a sexual preference of a particular kind may confer a selective advantage, and therefore become established in the species. Whenever appreciable differences exist in a species, which are in fact correlated with selective advantage, there will be a tendency to select also those individuals of the opposite sex which most clearly discriminate the difference to be observed, and which most decidedly prefer the more advantageous type. Sexual preference originated in this way may or may not confer any direct advantage upon the individuals selected, and so hasten the effect of the Natural Selection in progress. It may therefore be far more widespread than the occurrence of striking secondary sexual characters.

— R.A. Fisher (1930)

A strong female choice for the expression alone, as opposed to the function, of a male ornament can oppose and undermine the forces of natural selection and result in the runaway sexual selection that leads to the further exaggeration of the ornament (as well as the preference) until the costs (incurred by natural selection) of the expression become greater than the benefit (bestowed by sexual selection).

=== Peacocks and sexual dimorphism ===
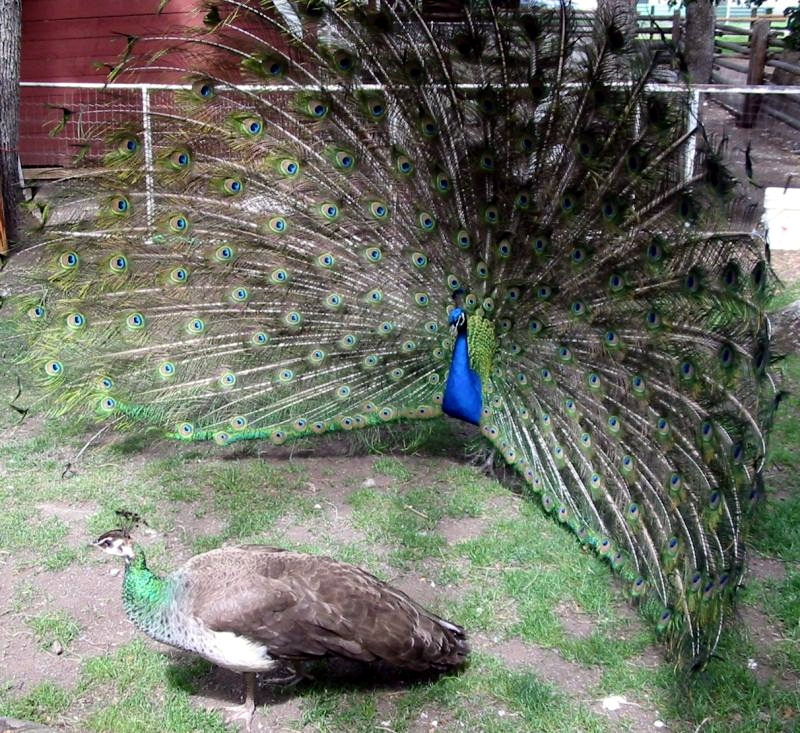
The peacock, on the right, is courting the peahen, on the left.

The plumage dimorphism of the peacock and peahen of the species within the genus Pavo is a prime example of the ornamentation paradox that has long puzzled evolutionary biologists; Darwin wrote in 1860:

The sight of a feather in a peacock's tail, whenever I gaze at it, makes me sick!

The peacock's colourful and elaborate tail requires a great deal of energy to grow and maintain. It also reduces the bird's agility, and may increase the animal's visibility to predators. The tail appears to lower the overall fitness of the individuals who possess it. Yet, it has evolved, indicating that peacocks who have longer and more colourfully elaborate tails have some advantage over peacocks who do not. Fisherian runaway posits that the evolution of the peacock tail is made possible if peahens have a preference to mate with peacocks that possess a longer and more colourful tail. Peahens that select males with these tails in turn have male offspring that are more likely to have long and colourful tails and thus are more likely to be sexually successful themselves. Equally importantly, the female offspring of these peahens are more likely to have a preference for peacocks with longer and more colourful tails. However, though the relative fitness of males with large tails is higher than those without, the absolute fitness levels of all the members of the population (both male and female) is less than it would be if none of the peahens (or only a small number) had a preference for a longer or more colourful tail.

== Mechanism ==
=== Initiation ===
Fisher outlined two fundamental conditions that must be fulfilled for the Fisherian runaway mechanism to lead to the evolution of extreme ornamentation:

1. Sexual preference in at least one of the sexes
2. A corresponding reproductive advantage to the preference.

Fisher argued in his 1915 paper, "The evolution of sexual preference", that the type of female preference necessary for Fisherian runaway could be initiated without any understanding or appreciation for beauty. Fisher suggested that any visible features that indicate fitness, that are not themselves adaptive, that draw attention, and that vary in their appearance amongst the population of males so that the females can easily compare them, would be enough to initiate Fisherian runaway. This suggestion is compatible with his theory, and indicates that the choice of feature is essentially arbitrary, and could be different in different populations. Such arbitrariness is borne out by mathematical modelling, and by observation of isolated populations of sandgrouse, where the males can differ markedly from those in other populations.

=== Genetic basis ===
Fisherian runaway assumes that sexual preference in females and ornamentation in males are both genetically variable (heritable).

If instead of regarding the existence of sexual preference as a basic fact to be established only by direct observation, we consider that the tastes of organisms ... be regarded as the products of evolutionary change, governed by the relative advantage which such tastes may confer. Whenever appreciable differences exist in a species ... there will be a tendency to select also those individuals of the opposite sex which most clearly discriminate the difference to be observed, and which most decidedly prefer the more advantageous type.
— R. A. Fisher (1930)

=== Female choice ===
Fisher argued that the selection for exaggerated male ornamentation is driven by the coupled exaggeration of female sexual preference for the ornament.

Certain remarkable consequences do, however, follow ... in a species in which the preferences of ... the female, have a great influence on the number of offspring left by individual males. ... development will proceed, so long as the disadvantage is more than counterbalanced by the advantage in sexual selection ... there will also be a net advantage in favour of giving to it a more decided preference.
— R. A. Fisher (1930)

=== Positive feedback ===
Over time a positive feedback mechanism, one that involves a loop in which an increase in a quantity causes a further increase in the same quantity, will see more exaggerated sons and choosier daughters being produced with each successive generation; resulting in the runaway selection for the further exaggeration of both the ornament and the preference (until the costs for producing the ornament outweigh the reproductive benefit of possessing it).

The two characteristics affected by such a process, namely [ornamental] development in the male, and sexual preference for such development in the female, must thus advance together, and … will advance with ever increasing speed. [I]t is easy to see that the speed of development will be proportional to the development already attained, which will therefore increase with time exponentially, or in a geometric progression.
— R. A. Fisher (1930)

Such a process must soon run against some check. Two such are obvious. If carried far enough … counterselection in favour of less ornamented males will be encountered to balance the advantage of sexual preference; … elaboration and … female preference will be brought to a standstill, and a condition of relative stability will be attained. It will be more effective still if the disadvantage to the males of their sexual ornaments so diminishes their numbers surviving, relative to the females, as to cut at the root of the process, by demising the reproductive advantage to be conferred by female preference.
— R. A. Fisher (1930)

== Alternative hypotheses ==
Several alternative hypotheses use the same genetic runaway (or positive feedback) mechanism but differ in the mechanisms of the initiation. Indicator hypotheses suggest that females choose desirably ornamented males because the cost of producing the desirable ornaments is indicative of good genes by way of the individual's vigour; for instance, the handicap principle proposes that females distinguish the best males by the measurable cost of certain visible features which have no other purpose, by analogy with a handicap race, in which the best horses carry the largest weights.

The sensory exploitation hypothesis proposes that sexual preferences for exaggerated traits are the result of sensory biases, such as that for supernormal stimuli.

== See also ==
- Costly signaling theory in evolutionary psychology
- Evolutionary suicide
- Secondary sex characteristic
