= V. C. Wynne-Edwards =

English zoologist

Vero Copner Wynne-Edwards CBE FRS FRSE FRSC
- Wynne-Edwards in 1969
- Born: 4 July 1906; Leeds, England
- Died: 5 January 1997 (aged 90); Banchory, Aberdeenshire, Scotland
- Education: New College, Oxford
- Known for: Group selection
- Awards: Neill Prize (1973); Frink Medal (1980); Walker Prize
- Scientific career
- Fields: Zoology
- Workplaces: McGill University (1930-1946); Aberdeen University (1946-1974)

Vero Copner Wynne-Edwards (4 July 1906 – 5 January 1997) was an English ornithologist and evolutionary biologist who held professorships in biology and zoology at McGill University and the University of Aberdeen. He is known for his zoological fieldwork of migratory birds, and primarily his pioneering of the evolutionary theory of group selection, which suggests that natural selection can select for variation between groups, rather than an individual within a group, which forms the basis of the gene-centric view of evolution.

He was made Commander of the Order of the British Empire in 1972, an Officer in the Order of Canada in 1991, and was elected a Fellow of the Royal Society of Edinburgh in 1950, of the Royal Society of Canada in 1969, and of the Royal Society of London in 1977.

== Early life and education ==
Wynne-Edwards was born in Leeds on 4 July 1906, the son of Reverend John Rosindale Wynne-Edwards and his wife, Lilian Agnes Streatfield. His father was the canon of Ripon Cathedral and headmaster at Leeds Grammar School, where Wynne-Edwards received his early schooling. He was sent to boarding school at Rugby School in Warwickshire in 1920, at age 13. While at Rugby, he attended lectures by figures such as Sir Ernest Shackleton, who visited the school shortly before leaving on his final Antarctic voyage, and the English evolutionary biologist Julian Huxley, who was later to be his advisor at Oxford University.

He graduated from Rugby in 1924 and intended to join expeditions to the Himalayas, though interested in surveying the local ecology rather than the then-popular interest in Mount Everest due to the celebrity of Everest-challengers George Mallory and Robert Lock Graham Irving in the 1920s. On the advice of his father, however, he instead enrolled at New College, Oxford University, to read zoology in hopes of acquiring Huxley as a tutor (students under Oxford and Cambridge Universitys' tutorial system have an advisor at the undergraduate level). He was unsuccessful in this, as Huxley left in 1925 to take up the chair of the Department of Zoology at King's College London. Instead, he was tutored by Charles Sutherland Elton and E. B. Ford, both pioneers of population ecology and former pupils of Huxley, whom he cited as far more lasting influences on his scientific life. Wynne-Edwards did however credit Huxley with his introduction to his future wife Jeannie Morris, who was studying botany but was "won over" to ecology by Huxley's lectures. He graduated from New College with first-class honors in 1927.

== Career ==
After graduating from Oxford, Wynne-Edwards was given a postgraduate position (termed a "Senior Scholar" at New College) at the Plymouth Laboratory of the Marine Biological Association of the United Kingdom at Citadel Hill, Plymouth, as part of an overall growth in staff and research efforts from increased scientific funding in the UK during the inter-war period. His primary project was studying the diverse male ecotypes of the crustacean Jassa falcata, and during this period he married his former Oxford classmate, Jeannie Morris. This marked the beginning of his scientific writing, with several papers publishing on the population ecology of starlings while at Plymouth. In 1929, he accepted a junior faculty position at the University of Bristol, but within a few months was offered an assistant professorship at McGill University, which he accepted, relocating with his wife to Montreal, Canada.

On the transatlantic crossing, Wynne-Edwards noticed and thoroughly recorded the distributions of several marine bird species, documenting for the first time ecological boundaries between inshore, offshore, and pelagic zones. He then convinced a contact at the British Cunard Line (then the Cunard Steamship Company Ltd.) to ferry him free of charge on five more Atlantic round-trips in May, June, July, August, and September of the following year, where he greatly expanded his recordings and subsequently had enough longitudinal data to define seasonal trends. For the resulting publication he was awarded the Walker Prize from the Boston Society of Natural History.

=== Second World War ===
Wynne-Edwards and his colleague Ronald Grant were dispatched on a fisheries research trip by the Fisheries Research Board of Canada on two powered-canoe journeys during World War II, surveying the Mackenzie and Yukon river systems. The voyage covered some 1300 miles of Slave River on a freight canoe during 1944, and 400 miles on the Lewes River in a flat-bottom boat during 1945, those being tributaries of the Mackenzie and Yukon Rivers respectively. They also chartered seaplanes to reach areas inaccessible by waterway.

He later served in the Royal Canadian Naval Reserve, after which he was offered a Regius Professorship in Natural History by the University of Aberdeen, which he accepted and held until his retirement in 1974. While at Aberdeen, he was elected a Fellow of the Royal Society, noted for his contributions to ecology and discovering "the existence of inshore, offshore and pelagic zones, each with a characteristic avian fauna".

He was elected a Fellow of the Royal Society of Edinburgh in 1950, proposed by Cyril Edward Lucas, Sir Maurice Yonge, Charles W. Parsons and John Berry, and awarded the Society's Patrick Neill Medal for the period 1973–75. He was made a Commander of the Order of the British Empire in 1974 and was given an honorary doctorate (LLD) by Aberdeen University.

== Advocacy of group selection ==
Wynne-Edwards was best known for his origination of what became the evolutionary theory of group selection. His earliest formal description of group selection was pubilshed in a 1959 issue of British Ornithologists' Union's peer-reviewed journal, The Ibis:

A theory is put forward that, for each species, population-densities are limited at a safe level, which will protect the food-supply from long-term depletion and assure its renewal for the future. Instead of competing directly for food, animals compete for conventional substitutes, e.g. territory or social position, which are capable of imposing a ceiling density at the optimum level, and can prevent it from rising to the starvation level which would endanger future resources.

— Vero Copner Wynne-Edwards, "The Control of Population-Density through Social Behavior: A Hypothesis"

He later expanded on the theory, most notably in his 1962 book Animal Dispersion in Relation to Social Behaviour and the popularizing of the phrase "for the good of the group" with respect to natural selection. In the book, he argued that variation (specifically on behavior, in this case) could arise and be positively selected if it benefited average rates of reproduction in the group as a whole, without providing a benefit to one variant. This immediately conflicted with the foundational principles of evolution by natural selection, whose central premise is a zero-sum dynamic in which a variant may increase in commonality due to positive effects on the reproductive success its carriers relative to other variants in the gene pool, which collectively experience an equivalent decrease. If the population simply increased uniformly, existing variation would remain at equal proportion in the now larger group and evolution, in its contemporary understanding, would not have occurred. Thus, while Wynne-Edwards' hypothetical group-beneficial variant could arise due to mutation or other diversifying process, if its benefit is distributed among the group then it cannot be positively selected relative to other variants in the group and is thus evolutionarily neutral, making group selection internally contradictory as a model.

Notably, this does not include situations where related individuals sharing a trait variant contribute to each other's reproductive success based on that shared variant, a concept known as kin selection, described formally by W.D. Hamilton two years after Wynne-Edwards' 1962 book. This can occur due to active distinguishing of closely related individuals, relying on physiology adapted to kin recognition, or it can be an indirect result of the variant producing similar outcomes or a coincidence of relatedness in structured populations. Wynne-Edwards' position and interpretation of his field observations are often understood to have been confusing broader "groups" for groups of specifically related individuals within a larger population. In that scenario, a variant promotes the reproductive success of closely related individuals who are likely to share that variant, thus natural selection can occur. Importantly, this dynamic exerts selection on the trait within that related group itself (i.e., between the beneficial variant and other variants in that group), and not between the related group and other groups, which is the fundamental level of analysis in group selection.

One specific example presented by Wynne-Edwards as a category of group selected adaptations are population-regulatory mechanisms, such as those designed to compete for newly scarce resources or restrict fertility to avoid boom-bust population crash. His arguments were vigorously criticized by George C. Williams in his 1966 book Adaptation and Natural Selection. This led to a prolonged debate, which was summarized by Richard Dawkins in The Selfish Gene, published in 1976, with Dawkin's taking William's side and coining the "gene-centric" view of evolution. David Sloan Wilson and E. O. Wilson (no relation) characterized Wynne-Edwards' theory as "naive group selection" on the basis that it did not use mathematical models, though they also provided examples of such modeling compatible with the theoretical suggestions Wynne-Edwards derived from his field work. Among the mechanisms that Wynne-Edwards proposed for population regulation to be trigged by detection of overpopulation was what he called epideictic displays, in which individuals advertised their genitals or other secondary sexual traits. If a population was becoming too dense, such displays would result in reduced breeding across the population, contrary to Darwinian natural selection but in line with Wynne-Edwards's group selection. This mechanism has never been demonstrated unequivocally in field or experimental biology.

== Awards ==
Wynne-Edwards was elected a Fellow of many scientific institutions including the American Ornithologists' Union (1991), the Cooper Ornithological Society (1961), the Finnish Society of Sciences and Letters (1965), the British Ecological Society (1977), and the Institute of Biology (1980). From 1965 to 1970, he was elected President of the British Ornithologists' Union (BOU), and in 1977 received the union's Godman-Salvin Medal. The same year, he was awarded the Neill Prize of the Royal Society of Edinburgh for 'outstanding contribution to natural history in Scotland'. He was twice awarded the Walker Prize of the Boston Society of Natural History, the first for his five trans-Atlantic field research trips on marine birds.

He was made Commander of the Order of the British Empire in 1972, an Officer in the Order of Canada in 1991, and was elected a Fellow of the Royal Society of Edinburgh in 1950, the Royal Society of Canada in 1969, and the Royal Society of London in 1977.

== Personal life and family ==
He married Jeannie Morris in 1929, and the couple had a son, Hugh (1934–2013), who returned to Canada after the family relocated back to Aberdeen in 1947, receiving his PhD in geological sciences from Queen's University in Kingston, Ontario in 1956, and joining the faculty of his alma mater from 1959 to 1972, when he took a position at the University of British Columbia as Professor and Head of Geological Sciences. His granddaughter, Katherine Wynne-Edwards, is Professor Emeritus of comparative biology at the University of Calgary.

After his retirement from the university there, Wynne-Edwards remained with his wife in Aberdeenshire, moving to Banchory, where he died on 5 January, 1997.

== Books ==
- Wynne-Edwards, V.C. (1962). Animal Dispersion in Relation to Social Behavior. London: Oliver & Boyd – via Internet Archive.
- Wynne-Edwards, Vero Copner (1986). Evolution through group selection. Oxford: Blackwell Scientific. ISBN 0-632-01541-1 – via Internet Archive.

== Bibliography ==
- Borrello, Mark E. (2005). "The rise, fall and resurrection of group selection". Endeavour. Vol. 29, no. 1. pp. 43–47. doi:10.1016/j.endeavour.2004.11.003. PMID 15749153.
- Borrello, Mark E. (2004). ""Mutual aid" and "animal dispersion": an historical analysis of alternatives to Darwin". Perspect. Biol. Med. Vol. 47, no. 1. pp. 15–31. doi:10.1353/pbm.2004.0003. PMID 15061166.
- Adaptation and Natural Selection (1966) Princeton University Press, Princeton, New Jersey.
- Group Selection(1971) Aldine·Atherton, Chicago, Illinois.
