= River Out of Eden =

Book by Richard Dawkins

- Cover of the softcover edition
- Author: Richard Dawkins
- Illustrator: Lalla Ward
- Language: English
- Subject: Evolutionary biology
- Publisher: Basic Books
- Publication date: 1995
- Publication place: United Kingdom
- Media type: Print
- Pages: 172 pp.
- ISBN: 0-465-01606-5
- OCLC: 31376584
- Dewey Decimal: 575 20
- LC Class: QH430 .D39 1995
- Preceded by: The Blind Watchmaker
- Followed by: Climbing Mount Improbable

River Out of Eden: A Darwinian View of Life is a 1995 popular science book by Richard Dawkins. The book is about Darwinian evolution and summarizes the topics covered in his earlier books, The Selfish Gene, The Extended Phenotype and The Blind Watchmaker. It is part of the Science Masters series and is Dawkins's shortest book. It is illustrated by Lalla Ward, Dawkins's then-wife. The book's name is derived from Genesis 2:10 relating to the Garden of Eden. The King James Version reads "And a river went out of Eden to water the garden; and from thence it was parted, and became into four heads."

River Out of Eden has five chapters. The first chapter lays down the framework on which the rest of the book is built, that life is like a river of genes flowing through geological time where organisms are mere temporary bodies. The second chapter shows how human ancestry can be traced via many gene pathways to different most recent common ancestors, with special emphasis on the African Eve. The third chapter describes how gradual enhancement via natural selection is the only mechanism which can create the observed complexity of nature. The fourth chapter describes the indifference of genes towards organisms they build and discard, as they maximise their own utility functions. The last chapter summarises milestones during the evolution of life on Earth and speculates on how similar processes may work in alien planetary systems.

== Summary ==
=== The digital river ===
Dawkins explains that everyone alive today has a continuous line of ancestors who survived to adulthood and reproduced, tracing all the way back to the very first single-celled organism, even though many organisms die without reproducing.

If the success of an organism is measured by its ability to survive and reproduce, then all living organisms can be said to have inherited "good genes" from successful ancestors. Each generation of organisms is a sieve against which replicated and mutated genes are tested. Good genes fall through the sieve into the next generation while bad genes are removed. This explains why organisms become better and better at whatever it takes to succeed, and is in stark contrast to Lamarckism, which would require successful organisms to refine their genes during their lifetime.

Following this gene-centered view of evolution, it can be argued that an organism is no more than a temporary body in which a set of companion genes (actually alleles) co-operate toward a common goal: to grow the organism into adulthood, before they go their separate ways in bodies of the organism's progeny. Bodies are created and discarded, but good genes live on as replicas of themselves, a result of a high-fidelity copy process typical of digital encoding.

Through meiosis (sexual reproduction), genes share bodies with different companion genes in successive generations. Thus genes can be said to flow in a river through geological time. Even though genes are selfish, over the long run every gene needs to be compatible with all other genes in the gene pool of a population of organisms, to produce successful organisms.

A river of genes may fork, mostly due to the geographical separation between two populations of organisms. Because genes in the two branches never share the same bodies, they may drift apart until genes from the two branches become incompatible. Organisms created by these two branches form separate, non-interbreeding species, completing the process of speciation.

=== All Africa and her progenies ===
When tracing human lineage back in time, most people look at parents, grandparents, great-grandparents and so on. The same approach is often taken when tracing descendants via children and grandchildren. Dawkins shows that this approach is misguided, as the numbers of ancestors and descendants seem to grow exponentially as generations are added to the lineage tree. In just 80 generations, the number of ancestors can exceed a trillion trillion.

This simple calculation does not take into account the fact that every marriage is really a marriage between distant cousins which include second cousins, fourth cousins, sixteenth cousins and so on. The ancestry tree is not really a tree, but a graph.

Dawkins prefers to model ancestry in terms of genes flowing through a river of time. An ancestor gene flows down the river either as perfect replicas of itself or as slightly mutated descendant genes. Dawkins fails to explicitly contrast ancestor organism and descendant organisms against ancestor genes and descendant genes in this chapter. But the first half of the chapter is really about differences between these two models of lineage. While organisms have ancestry graphs and progeny graphs via sexual reproduction, a gene has a single chain of ancestors and a tree of descendants.

Given any gene in the body of an organism, we can trace a single chain of ancestor organisms back in time, following the lineage of this one gene, as stated in the coalescent theory. Because a typical organism is built from tens of thousands of genes, there are numerous ways to trace the ancestry of organisms using this mechanism. But all these inheritance pathways share one common feature. If we start with all humans alive in 1995 and trace their ancestry by one particular gene (actually a locus), we find that the farther we move back in time, the smaller the number of ancestors become. The pool of ancestors continues to shrink until we find the most recent common ancestor (MRCA) of all humans alive in 1995 via this particular gene pathway.

In theory, one can also trace human ancestry via a single chromosome, as a chromosome contains a set of genes and is passed down from parents to children via independent assortment from only one of the two parents. But genetic recombination (chromosomal crossover) mixes genes from non-sister chromatids from both parents during meiosis, thus muddling the ancestry path.

However, the mitochondrial DNA (mtDNA) is immune to sexual mixing, unlike the nuclear DNA whose chromosomes are shuffled and recombined in Mendelian inheritance. Mitochondrial DNA, therefore, can be used to trace matrilineal inheritance and to find the Mitochondrial Eve (also known as the African Eve), the most recent common ancestor of all humans via the mitochondrial DNA pathway.

=== Do good by stealth ===
The main themes of the third chapter are borrowed from Dawkins' own book, The Blind Watchmaker. This chapter shows how the gradual, continuous and cumulative enhancement to organisms via natural selection is the only mechanism which can explain the complexity we observe all around us in nature. Dawkins adamantly refutes the "I cannot believe so and so could have evolved by natural selection" argument of Creationists, calling it the Argument from Personal Incredulity.

Creationists often claim that some features of organisms (e.g. resemblance of Ophrys (orchid) to female wasp, figure-eight dances of honeybees, mimicry of stick insects, etc.) are too complicated to be a result of evolution. Some say, "half of an X will not work at all." Others say, "in order for X to work, it had to be perfect the first time." Dawkins concludes that these are no more than bold assertions based on ignorance:

... Do you actually know the first thing about orchids, or wasps, or the eyes with which wasps look at females and orchids? What emboldens you to assert that wasps are so hard to fool that the orchid's resemblance would have to be perfect in all dimensions in order to work?

Dawkins goes on to illustrate his point by demonstrating how scientists have been able to fool creatures big and small using seemingly dumb triggers. For instance, stickleback fish treat a pear-shape as a sex bomb (a supernormal stimulus). Gulls' hard-wired instincts make them reach over and roll back not just their own stray eggs, but also wooden cylinders and cocoa tins. Honeybees push out their live and protesting companion from their hive, when the companion is painted with a drop of oleic acid. Furthermore, a turkey will kill anything which moves in its nest unless it cries like a baby turkey. If the turkey is deaf, it will mercilessly kill its own babies.

As part of this, Dawkins emphasises the gradual nature of evolution. For example, some creatures such as the stick insects possess the most amazing degree of camouflage, but in fact any sort of camouflage is better than none. There is a gradient from perfect camouflage to zero camouflage. A 100 percent camouflage is better than 99 percent. A 50 percent camouflage is better than 49 percent. A 1 percent camouflage is better than no camouflage. A creature with 1 percent better camouflage than its contemporaries will leave more descendants over time (an evolutionary success), and its good genes will come to dominate the gene pool.

Not only can we classify the degree of insect camouflage using a gradient, we can also study all aspects of the surrounding environment as gradients. For instance, a 1 percent camouflage may not be distinguishable from no camouflage under bright daylight. But as light fades and night sets in, there is a critical moment when the 1 percent camouflage helps an insect escape detection by its predator, while its companion with no camouflage is eaten. The same principle can be applied to the distance between prey and predator, to the angle of view, to the skill or the age of a creature, etc.

In addition to demonstrating how gradual changes can bring about features as complex as the human eye, Dawkins states that computer simulation work by Swedish scientists Dan Nilsson and Susanne Pelger (although it is not a computer simulation but simple mathematical model) shows that the eye could have evolved from scratch a thousand times in succession in any animal lineage. In Dawkins' own words, "the time needed for the evolution of the eye... turned out to be too short for geologists to measure! It is a geological blink." And, "it is no wonder the eye has evolved at least forty times independently around the animal kingdom."

=== God's utility function ===
This chapter is Dawkins's take on the meaning of life or the purpose of life.

Dawkins quotes how Charles Darwin lost his faith in religion, "I cannot persuade myself that a beneficent and omnipotent God would have designedly created the Ichneumonidae with the express intention of their feeding within the living bodies of Caterpillars." We ask why a caterpillar should suffer such cruel punishment. We ask why digger wasps couldn't first kill caterpillars to save them from a prolonged and agonising torture. We ask why a child should die an untimely death. And we ask why we should all grow old and die.

Dawkins rephrases the word purpose in terms of what economists call a utility function, meaning "that which is maximised". Engineers often investigate the intended purpose (or utility function) of a piece of equipment using reverse engineering. Dawkins uses this technique to reverse-engineer the purpose in the mind of the Divine Engineer of Nature, or the Utility Function of God.

According to Dawkins, it is a mistake to assume that an ecosystem or a species as a whole exists for a purpose. In fact, it is wrong to suppose that individual organisms lead a meaningful life either. In nature, only genes have a utility function – to perpetuate their own existence with indifference to great sufferings inflicted upon the organisms they build, exploit and discard. As hinted at in chapter one, genes are the supreme lords of the natural world. In other words, the unit of selection is the gene, not an individual, or any other higher-order group as championed by proponents of group selection.

As long as an organism survives its childhood and manages to reproduce thus passing its genes down to the next generation, what happens to the parent organism afterwards does not really bother genes. Because an organism is always at the danger of dying from accidents (a waste of investment), it pays for the genes to build an organism which pools almost all its resources to produce offspring as early as possible. Thus we accumulate damages to our body as we age and harbour late-onset diseases such as Huntington's disease which have minimum impact on the evolutionary success of our gene overlords.

Genes, Dawkins argues, are indifferent to who or what gets hurt, so long as DNA is passed on. He concludes:

During the minute it takes me to compose this sentence, thousands of animals are being eaten alive; others are running for their lives, whimpering with fear; others are being slowly devoured from within by rasping parasites; thousands of all kinds are dying from starvation, thirst and disease. It must be so. If there is ever a time of plenty, this very fact will automatically lead to an increase in population until the natural state of starvation and misery is restored.

=== The replication bomb ===
In the last chapter, Dawkins considers how Darwinian evolution may look outside planet Earth. It seems that the trigger event would be the spontaneous arising of self-replicating entities or the phenomenon of heredity. Once this process is initiated, it will launch an explosion of replicating entities until all available resources are used and all vacant niches are taken. Thus the title of the chapter.

Dawkins tries to distill ten milestones from the history of the only one replication bomb we know of, life on Earth. He strips any local conditions peculiar to Earth from these milestones which he calls thresholds, in the hope that these thresholds will be applicable to an alien evolution in an alien planetary system.

From the starting point of the Replicator Threshold, we may eventually reach the higher thresholds of Consciousness, Language, Technology, and Radio. The final threshold is Space Travel. In reaching the Moon, we have hardly made it past the front door.
