= The Selfish Genius =

2009 book by Fern Elsdon-Baker

The Selfish Genius: How Richard Dawkins Rewrote Darwin's Legacy
- Author: Fern Elsdon-Baker
- Language: English
- Subject: History and Philosophy of Science
- Genre: Popular Science
- Publisher: Icon books Ltd
- Publication date: 2009
- Pages: 240
- ISBN: 978-1-84831-049-0
- OCLC: 300404130

The Selfish Genius: How Richard Dawkins Rewrote Darwin's Legacy is a 2009 book by Fern Elsdon-Baker about the history of evolutionary theory, published to coincide with the 150th anniversary of the publication of Charles Darwin's On the Origin of Species. The book provides an overview of the historical and philosophical debates that have continued throughout the history of evolutionary theory, and carry on to this day in debates surrounding the merits of gene-centric selection and group selection models. The book is particularly critical of the popular science author Richard Dawkins, claiming that he presents a brand of evolutionary theory that portrays natural selection as acting at the level of the individual gene to the exclusion of group selection models which state that it could also act at the level of organisms or species. The book also claims Dawkins embraces an outdated and prescriptive conception of evolution that actually restricts debate rather than promoting it.

== Acclaim and criticism ==
The book has provoked controversy with some online commentary claiming it is another 'flea', a term used by Dawkins to describe people who have published books about him or his ideas. An article by Fern Elsdon-Baker in New Scientist of 19 July 2009 entitled the "Dawkins Dogma" contains parts of the arguments put forward within the book. The Selfish Genius has been criticized in The Economist for failing to fully understand Dawkins' selfish gene metaphor, with the reviewer claiming Dawkins accommodates proposed alternative evolutionary mechanism Elsdon-Baker suggests within her own ideas. However a generally positive reception has been seen amongst proponents of group selection and Philip Ball wrote a largely positive review in The Times that acknowledges she is right to "call time on a Whiggish view of the history of evolution". Popular Science author Brian Clegg reviewed the book and described it as brilliantly identifying how Dawkins' views sit within the latest theories on evolution.
