= Group Selection (book) =

1971 book edited by George C. William

- Cover
- Editor: George C. Williams
- Language: English
- Subject: Group selection
- Publication date: 1971
- Publication place: United States
- Media type: Print
- ISBN: 978-0202362229

Group Selection is a 1971 book edited by George C. Williams, containing papers written by biologists arguing against the view of group selection as a major force in evolution. The group of biologists writing on a single unified (if somewhat broad) theme contrasts with Williams' earlier seminal 1966 book Adaptation and Natural Selection, whose arguments Williams suspected to be his alone. In particular it contains a reprint, with an erratum, of W.D. Hamilton's classic 1964 paper on inclusive fitness, "The Genetical Evolution of Social Behavior" plus a paper by John Maynard Smith entitled "The Origin and Maintenance of Sex" (pp 163–175), containing ideas on evolution of sex later developed by Maynard Smith; see especially his 1978 book The Evolution of Sex.
