= The Genetical Evolution of Social Behaviour =

1964 scientific paper by W. D. Hamilton

"The Genetical Evolution of Social Behaviour" is the title of a pair of 1964 scientific papers by the British evolutionary biologist W.D. Hamilton in which he mathematically lays out the basis for inclusive fitness.

Hamilton, then only a PhD student, completed his work in London. It was based on Haldane's idea, but Hamilton showed that it applied to all gene frequencies. Although initially obscure, it is now highly cited in biology books, and has gone on to reach such common currency that citations are now often unnecessary as it is assumed that the reader is so familiar with kin selection and inclusive fitness that he need not use the reference to obtain further information.

The paper's peer review process led to disharmony between one of the reviewers, John Maynard Smith and Hamilton. Hamilton thought that Maynard Smith had deliberately kept the paper, which has difficult mathematics, from publication so that Maynard Smith could claim credit for the concept of kin selection in his own paper.

The American George R. Price found Hamilton's paper, and finding trouble in its implications for sociobiology, tried to disprove it but ended up rederiving his work through the Price equation.

The paper has been reprinted in books twice, firstly in George C. Williams's Group Selection, and secondly in the first volume of Hamilton's collected papers Narrow Roads of Gene Land. The latter includes a background essay by Hamilton.

Hamilton had previously written a short note explaining the background in 1988 when ISI recorded it as a citation classic.

== See also ==
- Group Selection (book by G. C. Williams which contains this paper)
