= Group selection =

Proposed mechanism of evolution

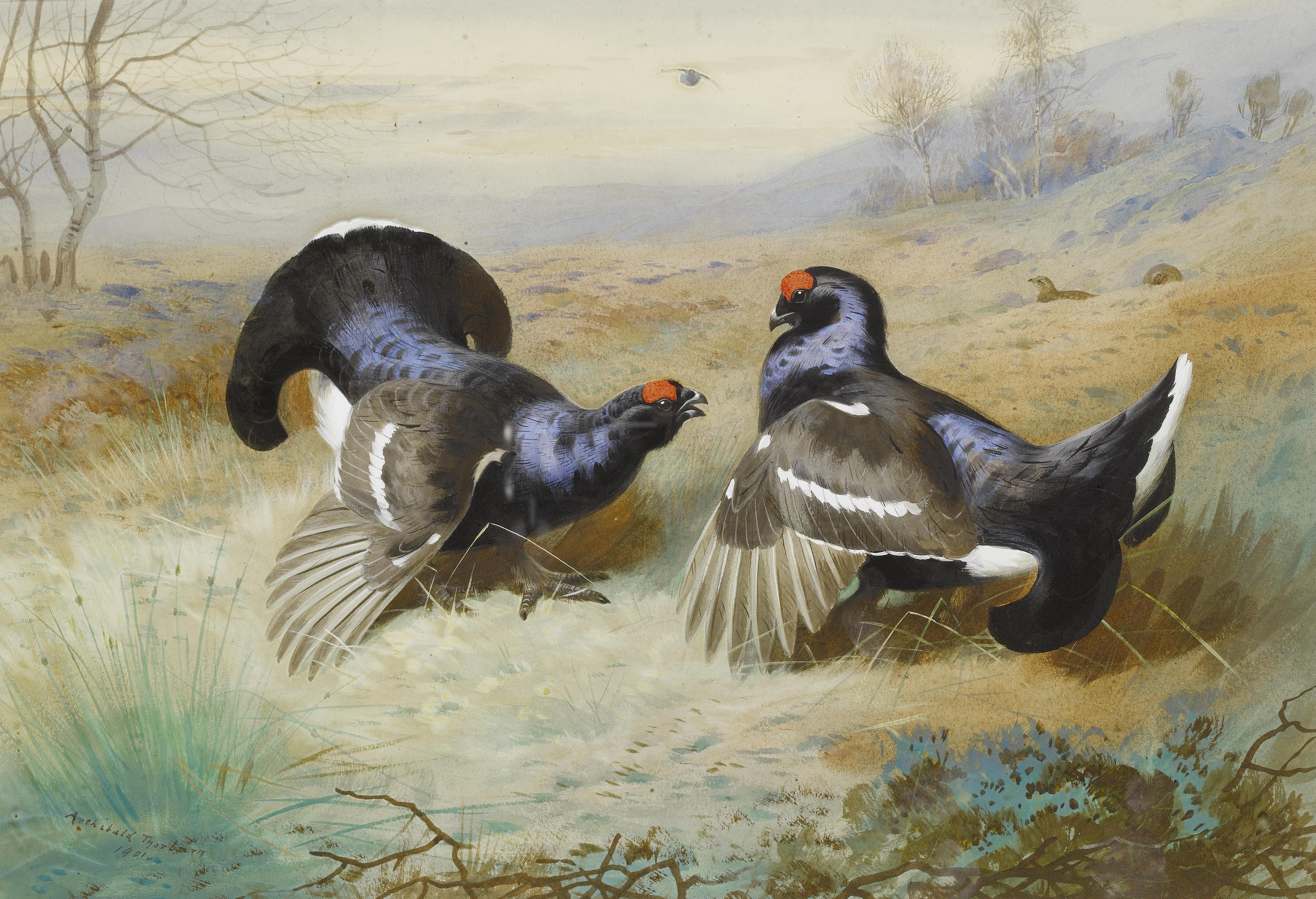
Early explanations of social behaviour, such as the lekking of blackcock, spoke of "the good of the species". Blackcocks at the Lek watercolour and bodycolour by Archibald Thorburn, 1901.

Group selection is a proposed mechanism of evolution in which natural selection acts at the level of the group, instead of at the level of the individual or gene.

Early authors such as V. C. Wynne-Edwards and Konrad Lorenz argued that the behaviour of animals could affect their survival and reproduction as groups, speaking for instance of actions for the good of the species. In the 1930s, Ronald Fisher and J. B. S. Haldane proposed the concept of kin selection, a form of biological altruism from the gene-centered view of evolution, arguing that animals should sacrifice for their relatives, and thereby implying that they should not sacrifice for non-relatives. From the mid-1960s, evolutionary biologists such as John Maynard Smith, W. D. Hamilton, George C. Williams, and Richard Dawkins argued that natural selection acts primarily at the level of the gene. They argued on the basis of mathematical models that individuals would not altruistically sacrifice fitness for the sake of a group unless it would ultimately increase the likelihood of an individual passing on their genes. A consensus emerged that group selection did not occur, including in special situations such as the haplodiploid social insects like honeybees, where kin selection explains the behaviour of non-reproductives equally well, since the only way for them to reproduce their genes is via kin.

In 1994 David Sloan Wilson and Elliott Sober argued for multi-level selection, including group selection, on the grounds that groups, like individuals, could compete. In 2010 three authors including E. O. Wilson, known for his work on social insects especially ants, again revisited the arguments for group selection. They argued that group selection can occur when competition between two or more groups, some containing altruistic individuals who act cooperatively together, is more important for survival than competition between individuals within each group. A large group of ethologists conceded that while inclusive fitness may be debatable, it was still a useful theory in practice. However, the vast majority of behavioural biologists have not been convinced by renewed attempts to revisit group selection as a plausible mechanism of evolution.

== Background ==
Charles Darwin developed the theory of evolution in his book, Origin of Species. Darwin also made the first suggestion of group selection in The Descent of Man that the evolution of groups could affect the survival of individuals. He wrote, "If one man in a tribe... invented a new snare or weapon, the tribe would increase in number, spread, and supplant other tribes. In a tribe thus rendered more numerous there would always be a rather better chance of the birth of other superior and inventive members."

Once Darwinism had been accepted in the modern synthesis of the mid-twentieth century, animal behaviour was glibly explained with unsubstantiated hypotheses about survival value, which was largely taken for granted. The naturalist Konrad Lorenz had argued loosely in books like On Aggression (1966) that animal behaviour patterns were "for the good of the species", without actually studying survival value in the field. The evolutionary biologist Richard Dawkins wrote that Lorenz was a "'good of the species' man", so accustomed to group selection thinking that he did not realize his views "contravened orthodox Darwinian theory". The ethologist Niko Tinbergen praised Lorenz for his interest in the survival value of behaviour, and naturalists enjoyed Lorenz's writings for the same reason. In 1962, group selection was used as a popular explanation for adaptation by the zoologist V. C. Wynne-Edwards. In 1976, Dawkins wrote a well-known book on the importance of evolution at the level of the gene or the individual, The Selfish Gene.

From the mid-1960s, evolutionary biologists argued that natural selection acted primarily at the level of the individual. In 1964, John Maynard Smith, C. M. Perrins (1964), and George C. Williams in his 1966 book Adaptation and Natural Selection cast serious doubt on group selection as a major mechanism of evolution; Williams's 1971 book Group Selection assembled writings from many authors on the same theme.

It was in the 1960s generally agreed that group selection also applied for eusocial insects such as honeybees.

== Kin selection and inclusive fitness theory ==
=== Theory makes group selection difficult ===
Altruistic group selection may seem to work well, but individual selection with cheating works better and replaces it.

Experiments from the late 1970s suggested that selection involving groups was possible. Early group selection models assumed that genes acted independently, for example a gene that coded for cooperation or altruism. Genetically based reproduction of individuals implies that, in group formation, the altruistic genes would need a way to act for the benefit of members in the group to enhance the fitness of many individuals with the same gene. But it is expected from this model that individuals of the same species would compete against each other for the same resources. This would put cooperating individuals at a disadvantage, making genes for cooperation likely to be eliminated. Group selection on the level of the species is flawed because it is difficult to see how selective pressures would be applied to competing/non-cooperating individuals.

=== Alternative explanation of altruism ===
Unlike group selection, kin selection between related individuals is accepted by most biologists as an explanation of altruistic behaviour. R.A. Fisher in 1930 and J.B.S. Haldane in 1932 set out the mathematics of kin selection, with Haldane famously joking that he would willingly die for two brothers or eight cousins. In this model, genetically related individuals cooperate because survival advantages to one individual also benefit kin who share some fraction of the same genes, giving a mechanism for selection in favour of this much altruism, without involving group selection.

Inclusive fitness theory, first proposed by W. D. Hamilton in the early 1960s, gives a selection criterion for evolution of social traits when social behaviour is costly to an individual organism's survival and reproduction. The criterion is that the reproductive benefit to relatives who carry the social trait, multiplied by their relatedness (the probability that they share the altruistic trait) exceeds the cost to the individual. Inclusive fitness theory is a general treatment of the statistical probabilities of social traits accruing to any other organisms likely to propagate a copy of the same social trait. Kin selection theory treats the narrower but simpler case of the benefits to close genetic relatives (or what biologists call 'kin') who may also carry and propagate the trait. The theory is widely accepted by biologists.

=== Kin recognition ===
One of the questions about kin selection is the requirement that individuals must know if other individuals are related to them, or kin recognition. Any altruistic act has to preserve similar genes. One argument given by Hamilton is that many individuals operate in "viscous" conditions, so that they live in physical proximity to relatives. Under these conditions, they can act altruistically to any other individual, and it is likely that the other individual will be related. This population structure builds a continuum between individual selection, kin selection, kin group selection and group selection without clear boundaries between these. However, early theoretical models by D. S. Wilson et al. and P. D. Taylor showed that pure population viscosity cannot lead to cooperation and altruism. This is because any benefit generated by kin cooperation is exactly cancelled out by kin competition; additional offspring from cooperation are eliminated by local competition. Mitteldorf and D. S. Wilson later showed that if the population is allowed to fluctuate, local populations can temporarily store the benefit of local cooperation and promote the evolution of cooperation and altruism. By assuming individual differences in adaptations, Jiang-Nan Yang further showed that the benefit of local altruism can be stored in the form of offspring quality and thus promote the evolution of altruism even if the population does not fluctuate. This is because local competition among more individuals resulting from local altruism increases the average local fitness of the individuals that survive.

=== Reciprocal altruism ===
Another explanation for the recognition of genes for altruism is that a single trait, reciprocal altruism, is capable of explaining the vast majority of altruism that is generally accepted as "good" by modern societies. The phenotype of altruism relies on recognition of the altruistic behaviour by itself. The trait of kindness is recognized by sufficiently intelligent and undeceived organisms in other individuals with the same trait. Moreover, the existence of such a trait predicts a tendency for kindness to unrelated organisms that are apparently kind, even if the organisms are of another species. The gene need not be exactly the same, so long as the effect or phenotype is similar. Multiple versions of the gene—or even meme—would have virtually the same effect. This explanation was given by Richard Dawkins as an analogy of a man with a green beard. Green-bearded men are imagined as tending to cooperate with each other simply by seeing a green beard, where the green beard trait is incidentally linked to the reciprocal kindness trait.

== Multilevel selection theory ==
=== Context ===
Early group selection models were flawed because they assumed that genes acted independently; but genetically based interactions among individuals are ubiquitous in group formation because genes must cooperate for the benefit of association in groups to enhance the fitness of group members. Additionally, group selection at the species level is flawed because it is difficult to see how selective pressures would be applied; selection in social species of groups against other groups, rather than the species entire, would be more plausible. In contrast, kin selection is accepted as an explanation of altruistic behaviour. The biologist Charles Goodnight argues that kin selection and multilevel selection are both needed to "obtain a complete understanding of the evolution of a social behavior system".

=== A revived group selection theory ===
In 1994, the evolutionary biologist David Sloan Wilson and the philosopher of biology Elliott Sober argued that the case against group selection had been overstated. They considered whether groups can have functional organization in the same way as individuals, and consequently whether groups can be "vehicles" for selection. They do not posit evolution on the level of the species, but selective pressures that winnow out small groups within a species, e.g. groups of social insects or primates. Groups that cooperate better might survive and reproduce more than those that did not. Resurrected in this way, D. S. Wilson & Sober's new group selection is called multilevel selection theory.

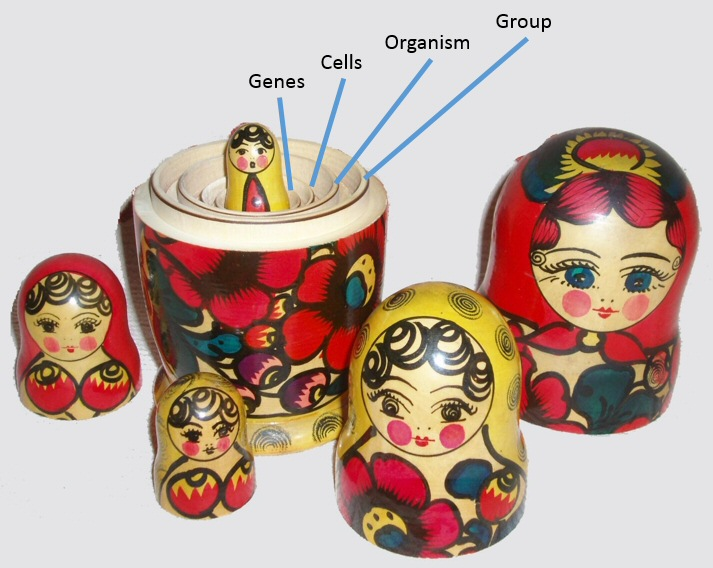
David Sloan Wilson and Elliott Sober's 1994 Multilevel Selection Model, illustrated by a nested set of Russian matryoshka dolls. Wilson himself compared his model to such a set.

D. S. Wilson compared the layers of competition and evolution to nested sets of Russian matryoshka dolls. The lowest level is the genes, next come the cells, then the organism level and finally the groups. The different levels function cohesively to maximize fitness, or reproductive success. The theory asserts that selection for the group level, involving competition between groups, must outweigh the individual level, involving individuals competing within a group, for a group-benefiting trait to spread.

Multilevel selection theory focuses on the phenotype because it looks at the levels that selection directly acts upon. For humans, social norms can be argued to reduce individual level variation and competition, thus shifting selection to the group level. The assumption is that variation between different groups is larger than variation within groups. Competition and selection can operate at all levels regardless of scale. D. S. Wilson wrote, "At all scales, there must be mechanisms that coordinate the right kinds of action and prevent disruptive forms of self-serving behavior at lower levels of social organization." E. O. Wilson summarized, "In a group, selfish individuals beat altruistic individuals. But, groups of altruistic individuals beat groups of selfish individuals."

D. S. Wilson argues that while kin selection works well for the behaviour of many animals, human behaviour is difficult to explain using kin selection alone. In particular, he claims it does not explain the rapid rise of human civilization, and that other factors must be considered. He and others have continued to develop group selection models. He ties the multilevel selection theory regarding humans to another theory, gene–culture coevolution, by acknowledging that culture seems to characterize a group-level mechanism for human groups to adapt to environmental changes.

D. S. Wilson and Sober's work revived interest in multilevel selection. In a 2005 article, E. O. Wilson argued that kin selection could no longer be thought of as underlying the evolution of extreme sociality, for two reasons. First, he suggested, the argument that haplodiploid inheritance (as in the Hymenoptera) creates a strong selection pressure towards nonreproductive castes is mathematically flawed. Second, eusociality no longer seems to be confined to the hymenopterans; increasing numbers of highly social taxa have been found in the years since E. O. Wilson's foundational text Sociobiology: A New Synthesis was published in 1975. These including a variety of insect species, as well as two rodent species (the naked mole-rat and the Damaraland mole rat). E. O. Wilson suggests that the equation for Hamilton's rule:

rb > c

(where b represents the benefit to the recipient of altruism, c the cost to the altruist, and r their degree of relatedness) should be replaced by the more general equation

rb_{k} + b_{e} > c

in which b_{k} is the benefit to kin (b in the original equation) and b_{e} is the benefit accruing to the group as a whole. He then argues that, in the present state of the evidence in relation to social insects, it appears that b_{e}>rb_{k}, so that altruism needs to be explained in terms of selection at the colony level rather than at the kin level. However, kin selection and group selection are not distinct processes, and the effects of multi-level selection are already accounted for in Hamilton's rule, rb>c, provided that an expanded definition of r, not requiring Hamilton's original assumption of direct genealogical relatedness, is used, as proposed by E. O. Wilson himself.

=== Debate in Nature ===
In 2010, the mathematical biologists Martin Nowak and Corina Tarnita, with the entomologist E. O. Wilson, argued in Nature for multi-level selection, including group selection, to correct what they saw as deficits in the explanatory power of inclusive fitness. 137 other evolutionary biologists, also in Nature, responded "that their arguments are based upon a misunderstanding of evolutionary theory and a misrepresentation of the empirical literature".

=== Proposed applications ===
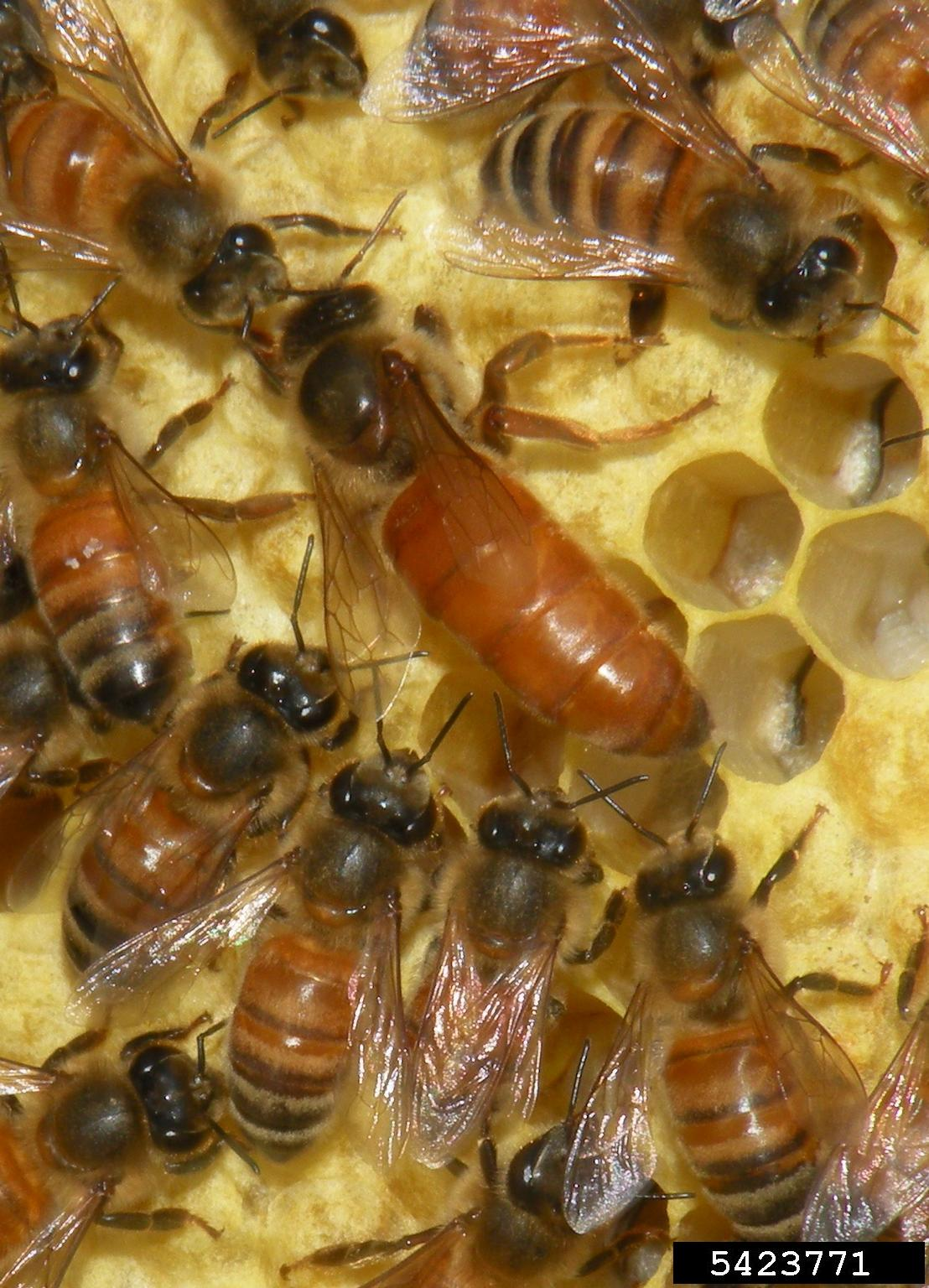
Social behaviour in honeybees looked a good candidate for group selection, but is explained by kin selection: their haplodiploid inheritance system makes workers very closely related to their queen (centre).

Multi-level selection theory is proposed as suitable for evaluating the balance between group selection and individual selection in specific cases. An experiment by William Muir compared egg productivity in hens, showing that a hyper-aggressive strain had been produced through individual selection, leading to many fatal attacks after only six generations; by implication, it could be argued that group selection must have been acting to prevent this in real life. Group selection has most often been postulated in humans and in eusocial Hymenoptera such as honeybees that make cooperation a driving force of their adaptations over time, and therefore seemed likely candidates for group selection. However, eusocial insects have a unique system of inheritance involving haplodiploidy that allows the colony to function as an individual while only the queen reproduces.

=== Evidence on both sides ===
Spatial populations of predators and prey show restraint of reproduction at equilibrium, both individually and through social communication, as originally proposed by Wynne-Edwards. While these spatial populations do not have well-defined groups for group selection, the local spatial interactions of organisms in transient groups are sufficient to lead to a kind of multi-level selection. There is however as yet no evidence that these processes operate in the situations where Wynne-Edwards posited them. Rauch et al.'s analysis of host-parasite evolution, on the other hand, is broadly hostile to group selection. Specifically, the parasites do not individually moderate their transmission; rather, more transmissible variants – which have a short-term but unsustainable advantage – arise, increase, and go extinct.

== Applications ==
=== Differing evolutionarily stable strategies ===
The problem with group selection is that for a whole group to get a single trait, it must spread through the whole group first by regular evolution. But, as J. L. Mackie suggested, when there are many different groups, each with a different evolutionarily stable strategy, there is selection between the different strategies, since some are worse than others. For example, a group where altruism was universal would indeed outcompete a group where every creature acted in its own interest, so group selection might seem feasible; but a mixed group of altruists and non-altruists would be vulnerable to cheating by non-altruists within the group, so group selection would collapse.

=== Implications in population biology ===
Altruism and group relationships can impact many aspects of population dynamics, such as intraspecific competition and interspecific interactions. In 1871, Darwin argued that group selection occurs when the benefits of cooperation or altruism between subpopulations are greater than the individual benefits of egotism within a subpopulation. This supports the idea of multilevel selection, but kinship also plays an integral role because many subpopulations are composed of closely related individuals. An example of this can be found in lions, which are simultaneously cooperative and territorial. Within a pride, males protect the pride from outside males, and females, who are commonly sisters, communally raise cubs and hunt. However, this cooperation seems to be density dependent. When resources are limited, group selection favours prides that work together to hunt. When prey is abundant, cooperation is no longer beneficial enough to outweigh the disadvantages of altruism, and hunting is no longer cooperative.

Interactions between different species, including predator-prey relationships, can be affected by multilevel selection. Individuals of certain monkey species howl to warn the group of the approach of a predator. The evolution of this trait benefits the group by providing protection, but could be disadvantageous to the individual if the howling draws the predator's attention to them. By affecting these interspecific interactions, multilevel and kinship selection can change the population dynamics of an ecosystem.

Multilevel selection attempts to explain the evolution of altruism in terms of quantitative genetics. Increased frequency or fixation of altruistic alleles can be accomplished through kin selection, in which individuals behave altruistically to promote the fitness of genetically similar individuals such as their siblings. This can lead to inbreeding depression, which typically lowers the overall fitness of a population. However, if altruism were to be selected for through an emphasis on benefit to the group as opposed to relatedness and benefit to kin, both the altruistic trait and genetic diversity could be preserved. Relatedness should still remain a key consideration in studies of multilevel selection. Experimentally imposed multilevel selection on Japanese quail was some ten times more effective on closely related kin groups than on randomized groups of individuals.

=== Gene-culture coevolution in humans ===
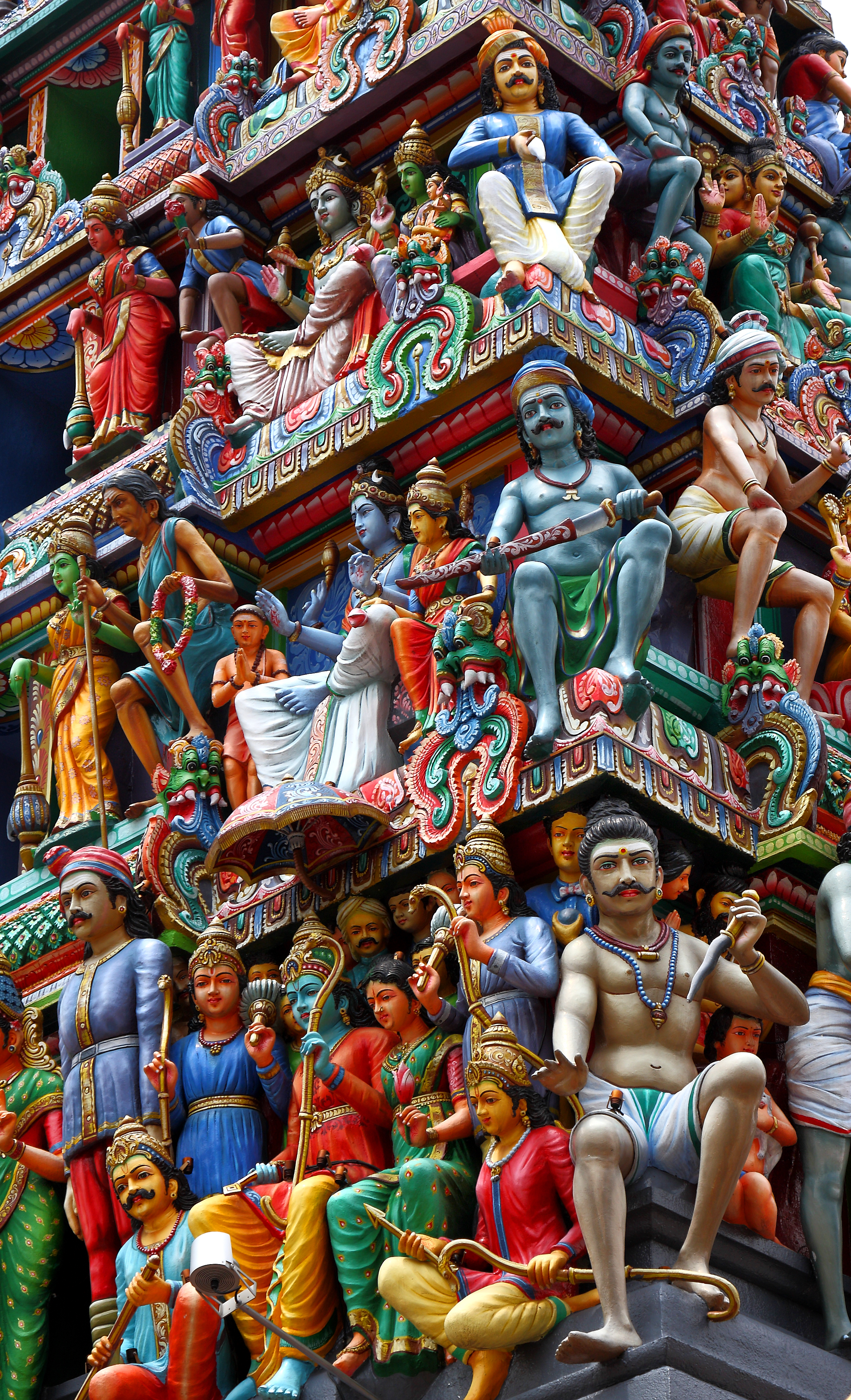
Humanity has developed extremely rapidly, arguably through gene-culture coevolution, leading to complex cultural artefacts like the gopuram of the Sri Mariammam temple, Singapore.

Gene-culture coevolution (also called dual inheritance theory) is a modern hypothesis (applicable mostly to humans) that combines evolutionary biology and modern sociobiology to indicate group selection. It is believed that this approach of combining genetic influence with cultural influence over several generations is not present in the other hypotheses such as reciprocal altruism and kin selection, making gene-culture evolution one of the strongest realistic hypotheses for group selection. Fehr provides evidence of group selection taking place in humans presently with experimentation through logic games such as prisoner's dilemma, the type of thinking that humans have developed many generations ago.

Gene-culture coevolution allows humans to develop highly distinct adaptations to the local pressures and environments more quickly than with genetic evolution alone. Robert Boyd and Peter J. Richerson, two strong proponents of cultural evolution, postulate that the act of social learning, or learning in a group as done in group selection, allows human populations to accrue information over many generations. This leads to cultural evolution of behaviours and technology alongside genetic evolution. Boyd and Richerson believe that the ability to collaborate evolved during the Middle Pleistocene, a million years ago, in response to a rapidly changing climate.

In 2003, the ethologist Herbert Gintis examined cultural evolution statistically, offering evidence that societies that promote pro-social norms have higher survival rates than societies that do not. Gintis wrote that genetic and cultural evolution can work together. Genes transfer information in DNA, and cultures transfer information encoded in brains, artifacts, or documents. Language, tools, lethal weapons, fire, cooking, etc., have a long-term effect on genetics. For example, cooking led to a reduction of size of the human gut, since less digestion is needed for cooked food. Language led to a change in the human larynx and an increase in brain size. Projectile weapons led to changes in human hands and shoulders, such that humans are much better at throwing objects than the closest human relative, the chimpanzee.

In 2015, William Yaworsky and colleagues surveyed the opinions of anthropologists on group selection, finding that these varied with the gender and politics of the social scientists concerned. In 2019, Howard Rachlin and colleagues proposed group selection of behavioural patterns, such as learned altruism, during ontogeny parallel to group selection during phylogeny.

== Rejection ==
=== Selfish benefits of 'altruism' ===
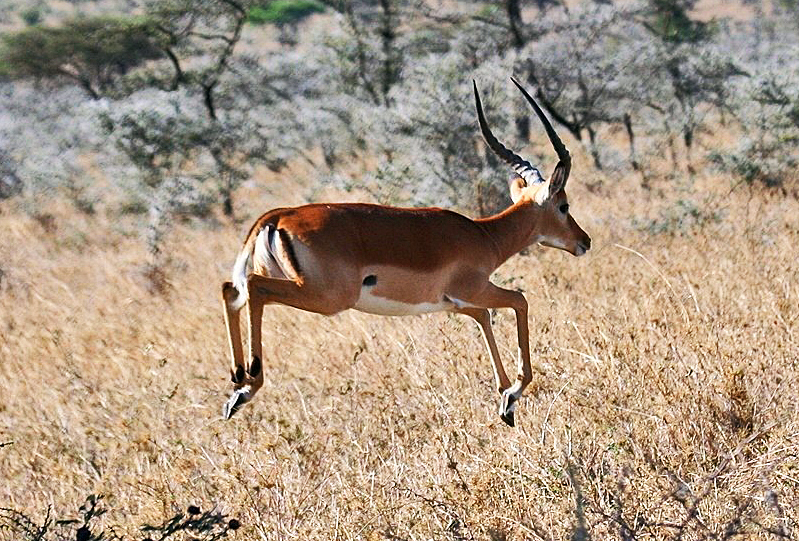
An impala stotting, signalling honestly to the predator that the chase will be unprofitable. Such a signal looks costly and altruistic, warning other prey animals that a predator is close, but can benefit the signaller by deterring pursuit.

An alarm signal looks like costly altruism, making group selection plausible; but it may also deter the predator from pursuit and create confusion, helping the selfish prey individual to escape.

The historian of science Peter J. Bowler writes that G.C. Williams and other naturalists "became suspicious" of group selection as an explanation for animal behaviour. A major issue, Bowler writes, is in finding a definitely altruistic behaviour, because an action like giving an alarm signal does assist other animals nearby, but it also creates a chaotic event which could, interpreted selfishly, help the caller to escape.

D.J. Woodland and colleagues have proposed, with evidence, that alarm signals have a pursuit deterrence function, rather than signalling altruistically to other members of their own species. A pursuit deterrence signal can benefit both predator and prey: the prey signals that the predator has been detected, possibly saving its own life (as the predator may then decide to give up the pursuit), and saving it and the predator the effort of an unproductive chase.

=== Mathematical issues ===
Advocates of the gene-centered view of evolution such as Dawkins and Daniel Dennett remain unconvinced about group selection.

The use of the Price equation to support group selection was challenged by Matthijs van Veelen and colleagues in 2012, arguing that it is based on invalid mathematical assumptions. They created a "simple model" where the Price equation resulted in a wrong prediction, meaning that it only works in some cases.

The evolutionary biologist Jerry Coyne summarizes the arguments against group selection in The New York Review of Books in non-technical terms as follows:

Group selection isn't widely accepted by evolutionists for several reasons. First, it's not an efficient way to select for traits, like altruistic behavior, that are supposed to be detrimental to the individual but good for the group. Groups divide to form other groups much less often than organisms reproduce to form other organisms, so group selection for altruism would be unlikely to override the tendency of each group to quickly lose its altruists through natural selection favoring cheaters. Further, little evidence exists that selection on groups has promoted the evolution of any trait. Finally, other, more plausible evolutionary forces, like direct selection on individuals for reciprocal support, could have made humans prosocial. These reasons explain why only a few biologists, like [David Sloan] Wilson and E. O. Wilson (no relation), advocate group selection as the evolutionary source of cooperation.

The psychologist Steven Pinker states that "group selection has no useful role to play in psychology or social science", since in these domains it "is not a precise implementation of the theory of natural selection, as it is, say, in genetic algorithms or artificial life simulations. Instead [in psychology] it is a loose metaphor, more like the struggle among kinds of tires or telephones."

=== Replicator–vehicle problem ===
In Richard Dawkins' view of evolution by natural selection, a vehicle, such as an organism, supports a replicator such as a gene, enabling it to act as a unit of evolution.

Dawkins argues that group selection fails to make an appropriate distinction between replicators (entities able to make copies of themselves) and vehicles (entities that contain replicators). Entities can only qualify as replicators if their self-copies are made with high-fidelity, they copy themselves abundantly, and they survive long enough to allow evolution to work. In support of this, the origin of life seems to have occurred at the same time as self-replicating molecules appeared, and which eventually formed into single-celled organisms. While selection pressure is exerted through phenotypes, Organisms do not qualify as replicators because acquired characteristics do not get inherited, while the genotype of a successful individual gets broken up and rearranged by meiosis and genetic recombination. On the other hand, populations (groups of organisms) also frequently fragment into separate populations, interbreed, and are subject to rapid evolutionary change as individuals compete and reproduce. As such, while genes serve as replicators, organisms and populations do not.

Randolph Nesse comments that, contrary to Wilson and Sober's view that biologists oppose group selection because they don't grasp the hierarchy of vehicles for selection, they do so because "we lack criteria to determine whether or not a trait arises from group selection". In Nesse's view, there is hardly any evidence for group selection, even though the question of whether it could theoretically serve as a vehicle is not disputed.

=== Subsumed by inclusive fitness theory ===
S.A. West, A.S. Griffin and A. Gardner write that kin selection theory works at all levels, and that the resulting inclusive fitness approach can be applied, with clearer predictions, wherever group selection can be applied. This treats the effect of group selection as a possible increment to individual selection, both going into the inclusive fitness calculation. Kin selection can, they write, get any result obtained by group selection theory, but more tractably, with testable predictions. Thus, even if a group selection effect exists, it does not negate inclusive fitness, but in their view is unnecessary and adds nothing except "confusing jargon".

== Sources ==
- Dawkins, Richard (1976). The Selfish Gene (1st ed.). Oxford University Press. ISBN 978-0-19-857519-1.
- Dawkins, Richard (2006) [1976]. The Selfish Gene (30th anniversary ed.). New York: Oxford University Press. ISBN 978-0-19-929115-1.
- Dawkins, Richard (1995). River Out of Eden. Basic Books. ISBN 978-0-465-06990-3.
- Dawkins, Richard (2016) [1989]. The Extended Phenotype: The Long Reach of the Gene (2nd ed.). Oxford University Press. ISBN 978-0-19-878891-1.
- Williams, George C. (2019) [1966]. Adaptation and Natural Selection: A Critique of Some Current Evolutionary Thought. Princeton University Press. ISBN 978-0-691-18286-5.
