= The Extended Phenotype =

1982 book by Richard Dawkins

- Cover of the first edition
- Author: Richard Dawkins
- Language: English
- Subject: Evolutionary biology
- Publisher: Oxford University Press
- Publication date: 1982
- Publication place: United Kingdom
- Media type: Print
- Pages: 307 pp.
- ISBN: 0-19-286088-7
- OCLC: 19921696
- Dewey Decimal: 575 20
- LC Class: QH375 .D38 1983
- Preceded by: The Selfish Gene
- Followed by: The Blind Watchmaker

The Extended Phenotype is a 1982 book by the evolutionary biologist Richard Dawkins, in which the author introduced a biological concept of the same name. The book's main idea is that phenotype should not be limited to biological processes such as protein biosynthesis or tissue growth, but extended to include all effects that a gene has on its environment, inside or outside the body of the individual organism.

Dawkins considers The Extended Phenotype to be a sequel to The Selfish Gene (1976) aimed at professional biologists, and as his principal contribution to evolutionary theory. In the 1999 reissue and subsequent reprintings an afterword by Daniel Dennett is included.

== Summary ==
=== Genes as the unit of selection in evolution ===
The central thesis of The Extended Phenotype, and of its predecessor by the same author, The Selfish Gene, is that individual organisms are not the true units of natural selection. Instead, the gene — or the 'active, germ-line replicator' — is the unit upon which the forces of evolutionary selection and adaptation act. It is genes that succeed or fail in evolution, meaning that they either succeed or fail in replicating themselves across multiple generations.

These replicators are not subject to natural selection directly, but indirectly through their "phenotypical effects". These effects are all the effects that the gene (or replicator) has on the world at large, not just in the body of the organism in which it is contained. In taking as its starting point the gene as the unit of selection, The Extended Phenotype is a direct extension of Dawkins' first book, The Selfish Gene.

=== Genes synthesise only proteins ===
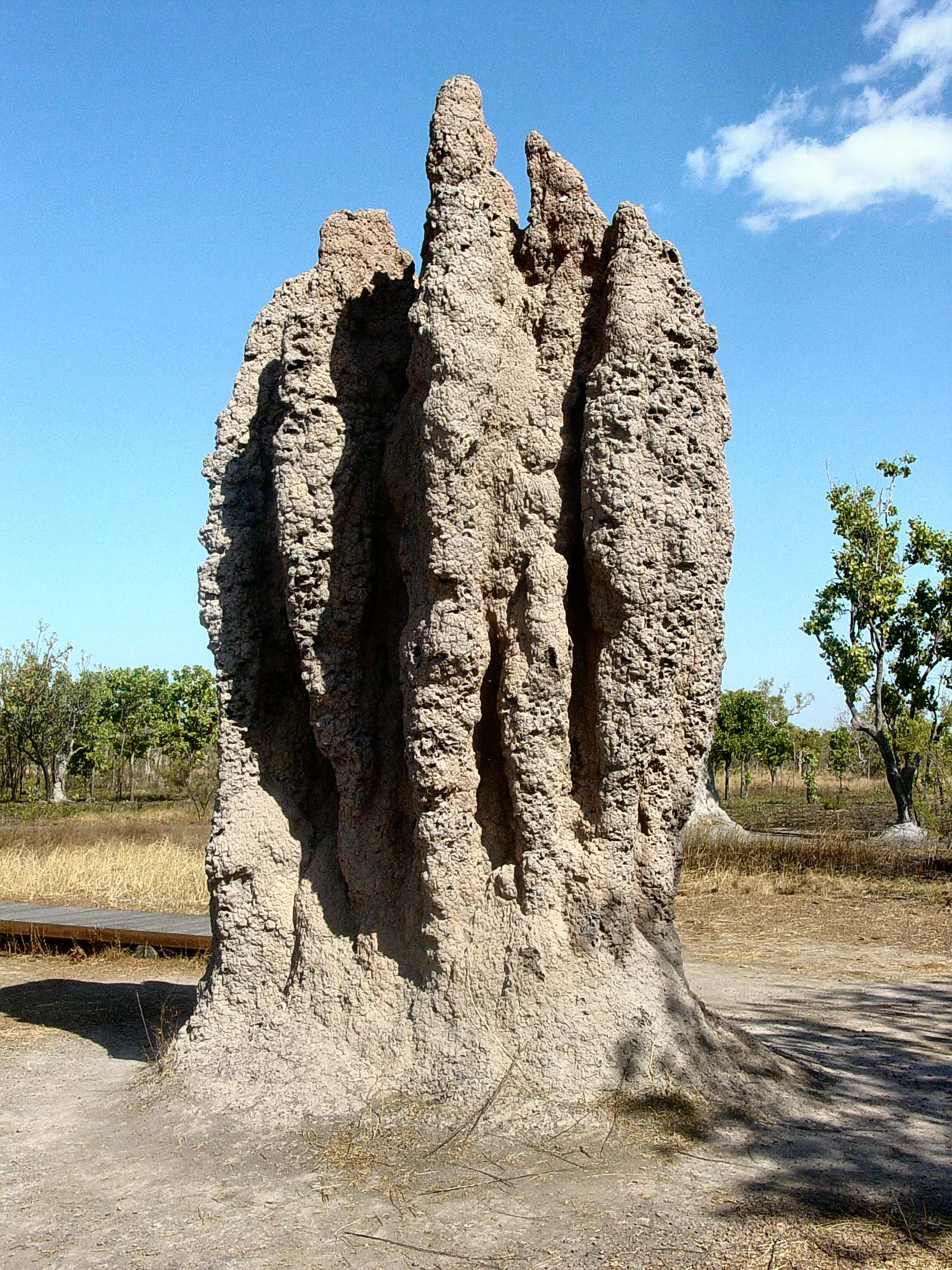
A cathedral termite mound – a small animal with a large extended phenotype

Dawkins argues that the only thing that genes control directly is the synthesis of proteins; restricting the idea of the phenotype to apply only to the phenotypic expression of an organism's genes in its own body is an arbitrary limitation that ignores the effect a gene may have on an organism's environment through that organism's behaviour.

=== Genes may affect more than the organism's body ===
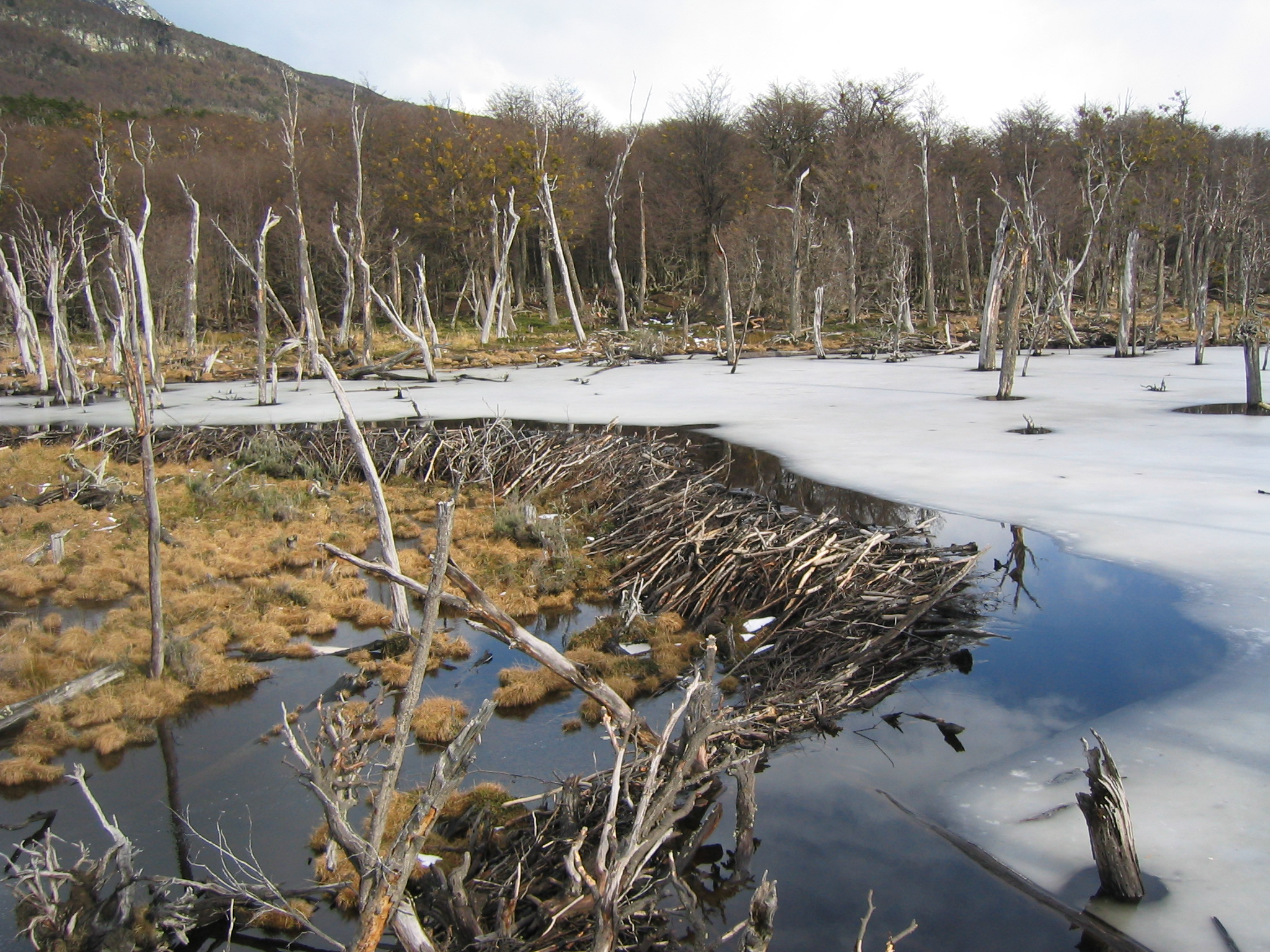
A beaver dam, an example of an organism altering the environment in which it evolves — the first form of extended phenotype

Dawkins proposes there are three forms of extended phenotype. The first is the capacity of animals to modify their environment using architectural constructions, for which Dawkins provides as examples caddis houses and beaver dams.

The second form is manipulation of other organisms: The morphology of a living organism, and possibly of that organism's behaviour, may influence not just the fitness of the organism itself, but that of other living organisms as well. One example of this is parasite manipulation. This refers to the capacity, found in some parasite-host interactions, for the parasite to modify the behaviour of the host in a way that enhances the parasite's own fitness. One well-known example of this second type of extended phenotype is the suicidal drowning of crickets infected by hairworm, a behaviour that is essential to the parasite's reproductive cycle. Another example is seen in female mosquitoes carrying malaria parasites. The mosquitoes infected with the parasites whose preferred hosts are humans have been shown in a field experiment to be significantly more attracted to human breath and odours than uninfected mosquitoes when the parasites are at a point in their life cycle where they can infect a human target.

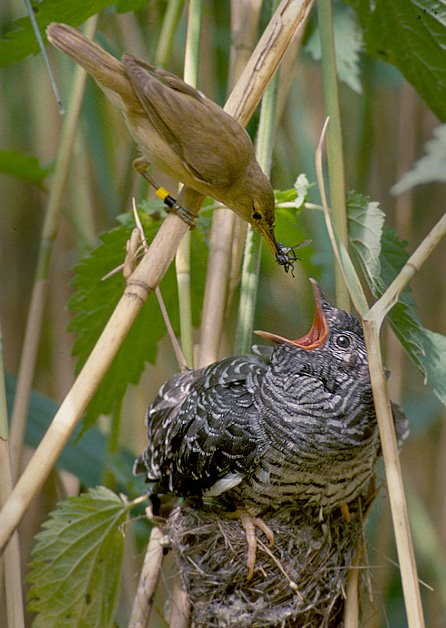
A reed warbler raising the young of a common cuckoo

The third form of extended phenotype is action at a distance of the parasite on its host. A common example is the manipulation of host behaviour by cuckoo chicks, which elicit intensive feeding by the host birds. Here the cuckoo does not interact directly with the host (which could be meadow pipits, dunnocks or reed warblers). The relevant adaptation lies in the cuckoo producing eggs and chicks that resemble sufficiently those of the host species so that they are not immediately ejected from the nest. These behavioural modifications are not physically associated with individuals of the host species but influence the expression of its behavioural phenotype.

Dawkins summarizes these ideas in what he terms the Central Theorem of the Extended Phenotype:

Taking these three things together, we arrive at our own 'central theorem' of the extended phenotype: An animal's behaviour tends to maximize the survival of the genes "for" that behaviour, whether or not those genes happen to be in the body of the particular animal performing it.

=== Gene-centred view of life ===
In developing this argument, Dawkins aims to strengthen the case for a gene-centric view of the evolution of life forms, to the point where it is recognized that the organism itself needs to be explained. This is the challenge which he takes up in the final chapter entitled "Rediscovering the Organism". The concept of extended phenotype has been generalized in an organism-centered view of evolution with the concept of niche construction, in the case where natural selection pressures can be modified by the organisms during the evolutionary process.

== Reception ==
A technical review of The Extended Phenotype in the Quarterly Review of Biology states that, it is an "interesting and thought provoking book, once one gets to the last five chapters." In the reviewer's opinion, the book poses interesting questions, such as "What is the survival value of packaging life into discrete units called 'organisms' even though the units of selection appear to be individual 'replicators'?" The reviewer states that no "satisfactory answer is given" to this question in the book, though Dawkins suggests that replicators that "interact favorably to create 'vehicles' (organisms) may be at an advantage over those that do not (Chapter 14)." The reviewer takes issue with the first nine chapters as being essentially a defense of Dawkin's first book, The Selfish Gene.

Another review in American Scientist praises the book for convincingly promoting the idea of replication as being central to the evolutionary process. However, in the reviewer's opinion, "its main theme - that the gene is the only unit of selection - results from incorrectly interpreting the constraints on organismal adaptation and from too narrow an interpretation of replication, a process of more general relevance than the author is willing to allow."

== Uses and limitations ==
The concept of extended phenotype has provided a useful frame for subsequent scientific work. For example, research into the relationship between "the bacterial flora of the gut and their mammalian hosts" which "has become a hot topic of late" makes use of this concept.

Subsequent proponents expand the theory and posit that many organisms within an ecosystem can alter the selective pressures on all of them by modifying their environment in various ways. Dawkins himself asserted, "Extended phenotypes are worthy of the name only if they are candidate adaptations for the benefit of alleles responsible for variations in them". As an illustration, one might ask: could an architect's buildings be considered part of his or her extended phenotype, much as a beaver's dam is part of its extended phenotype? Dawkins' answer is No: in humans, an "architect's specific alleles are neither more nor less likely to be selected based on the design of his or her latest building."

== See also ==
- Allele
- Group selection
- Inclusive fitness
- Kin selection
