= Nice Guys Finish First =

1986 British documentation television series

Nice Guys Finish First (BBC Horizon television series) is a 1986 documentary by Richard Dawkins which discusses selfishness and cooperation, arguing that evolution often favors co-operative behaviour, and focusing especially on the tit-for-tat strategy of the prisoner's dilemma game. The film is approximately 50 minutes long and was produced by Jeremy Taylor.

The twelfth chapter in Dawkins' book The Selfish Gene (added in the second edition, 1989) is also named Nice Guys Finish First and explores similar material.

== Overview ==
In the opening scene, Richard Dawkins responds very precisely to what he views as a misrepresentation of his first book, The Selfish Gene. In particular, the response of some of the right wing using it as justification for social Darwinism and laissez-faire economics (free-market capitalism). Dawkins has examined this issue throughout his career and focused much of his documentary The Genius of Charles Darwin on this very issue.

The concept of reciprocal altruism is a central theme of this documentary. Additionally, Dawkins examines the infamous tragedy of the commons and the dilemma that it presents. He presents Port Meadow in Oxford, England, a large area of common land which has been battered by overgrazing, as an example of the tragedy of the commons. Fourteen academics as well as experts in game theory submitted their own computer programs to compete in a tournament to see who would win in the prisoner's dilemma. The winner was tit for tat, a program based on "equal retaliation", and Dawkins illustrates the four conditions of tit for tat:

1. Unless provoked, the agent will always cooperate
2. If provoked, the agent will retaliate
3. The agent is quick to forgive
4. The agent must have a good chance of competing against the opponent more than once

In a second trial, this time involving over sixty applicants, tit for tat won again.

== See also ==
- Altruism in animals
- Ethology
- Evolutionarily stable strategy
- Evolutionary game theory
- Natural selection
- Prisoner's Dilemma
- Sociobiology
- The Selfish Gene
- Tit for tat
- Tragedy of the commons
- Mutual Aid: A Factor of Evolution
