= Green-beard effect =

Hypothesis for altruism in evolutionary biology

The green-beard effect is a form of selection in which individuals with genes that produce unique observable traits select individuals with the specific trait and thereby the same gene. In this illustration individuals selectively mate with individuals of the same head color.

The green-beard effect is a thought experiment used in evolutionary biology to explain selective altruism among individuals of a species.

== History ==
The idea of a green-beard gene was proposed by William D. Hamilton in his articles of 1964, and got the name from the example used by Richard Dawkins ("I have a green beard and I will be altruistic to anyone else with green beard") in The Selfish Gene (1976).

== Description ==
A green-beard effect occurs when an allele, or a set of linked alleles, produce three expressed (or phenotypic) effects:

1. a perceptible trait—the hypothetical "green beard"
2. recognition of this trait by others
3. preferential treatment of individuals with the trait by others with the trait

The carrier of the gene (or a specific allele) is essentially recognizing copies of the same gene (or a specific allele) in other individuals. Whereas kin selection involves altruism to related individuals who share genes in a non-specific way, green-beard alleles promote altruism toward individuals who share a gene that is expressed by a specific phenotypic trait. Some authors also note that the green-beard effects can include "spite" for individuals lacking the "green-beard" gene. This can have the effect of delineating a subset of organisms within a population that is characterized by members who show greater cooperation toward each other, this forming a "clique" that can be advantageous to its members who are not necessarily kin.

A green-beard effect could increase altruism on green-beard phenotypes and therefore its presence in a population even if genes assist in the increase of genes that are not exact copies; all that is required is that they express the three required characteristics. Green-beard alleles are vulnerable to mutations that produce the perceptible trait without the helping behaviour.

== Role in evolutionary theory ==
Altruistic behaviour is paradoxical when viewed in the light of old ideas of evolutionary theory that emphasised the role of competition. The evolution of altruism is better explained through the gene-centered view of evolution, which emphasizes an interpretation of natural selection from the point of view of the gene which acts as an agent that has the metaphorical "selfish goal" of maximizing its own propagation. A gene for (behavioral) selective altruism can be favored by (natural) selection if the altruism is primarily directed at other individuals who share the gene. Since genes are invisible, such an effect requires perceptible markers for altruistic behaviour to occur.

== Examples ==
Evolutionary biologists have debated the potential validity of green-beard genes, suggesting that it would be extraordinarily rare for a single or even a set of linked genes to produce three complex phenotypic effects. This criticism has led some to believe that they simply cannot exist or that they only can be present in less complex organisms, such as microorganisms. This critique has been called into question in recent years.

The concept remained a merely theoretical possibility under Dawkins' selfish gene model until 1998, when a green-beard allele was first found in nature by Laurent Keller and Kenneth G. Ross in the red imported fire ant (Solenopsis invicta). Polygyne colony queens are heterozygous (Bb) at the Gp-9 gene locus. Their worker offspring can have both heterozygous (Bb) and homozygous (BB) genotypes. The investigators discovered that homozygous dominant (BB) queens, which in the wild form produce monogyne rather than polygyne colonies, are specifically killed when introduced into polygyne colonies, most often by heterozygous (Bb) and not homozygous (BB) workers. They concluded that the allele Gp-9^{b} is linked to a greenbeard allele which induces workers bearing this allele to kill all queens that do not have it. A final conclusion notes that the workers are able to distinguish BB queens from Bb queens based on an odor cue.

The gene csA in the slime mould Dictyostelium discoideum, discovered in 2003, codes for a cell adhesion protein which binds to gp80 proteins on other cells, allowing multicellular fruiting body formation on soil. Mixtures of csA knockout cells with wild-type cells yield spores, "born" from the fruiting bodies, which are 82% wild-type (WT). This is because the wild-type cells are better at adhering and more effectively combine into aggregates; knockout (KO) cells are left behind. On more adhesive but less natural substances, KO cells can adhere; WT cells, still better at adhering, sort preferentially into the stalk.

In 2006, green beard-like recognition was seen in the cooperative behavior among color morphs in side-blotched lizards, although the traits appear to be encoded by multiple loci across the genome.

A more recent example, found in 2008, is a gene that makes brewer's yeast clump together in response to a toxin such as alcohol. By investigating flocculation, a type of self-adherence generally present in asexual aggregations, Smukalla et al. showed that S. cerevisiae is a model for cooperative behavior evolution. When this yeast expresses FLO1 in the laboratory, flocculation is restored. Flocculation is apparently protective for the FLO1+ cells, which are shielded from certain stresses (ethanol, for example). In addition FLO1+ cells preferentially adhere to each other. The authors therefore conclude that flocculation is driven by this greenbeard allele.

A mammalian example appears to be the reproductive strategy of the wood mouse, which shows cooperation among spermatozoa. Single sperms hook in each other to form sperm-trains, which are able to move faster together than single sperm would do.

It has been suggested that speciation could be possible through the manifestation of a green-beard effect.

Additionally, it has been suggested that suicide could have evolved through green-beard selection. Suicide is often a reaction to an undesirable social context. Attempting suicide imposes a threat of bereavement on community members. If bereavement from many previous suicides has been felt, then the community is likely to take a new suicide attempter seriously. Accordingly, previous suicides may increase the credibility of future suicide attempts, resulting in increased effort from the community to alleviate the undesirable social context.

A study has shown that humans are about as genetically equivalent to their friends as they are their fourth cousins.

== See also ==
- Maternal effect dominant embryonic arrest (the "Medea" gene): an example of intergenerational gene self-selection, whereby a gene present in a mother organism selectively terminates offspring that do not receive that gene.
- Reciprocal altruism
