= George Christopher Williams =

American evolutionary biologist (1926–2010)

George C. Williams
- Born: George Christopher Williams; May 12, 1926; Charlotte, North Carolina, U.S.
- Died: September 8, 2010 (aged 84)
- Education: UCLA
- Known for: theories of natural selection
- Awards: Daniel Giraud Elliot Medal (1992); Crafoord Prize (1999)
- Scientific career
- Fields: Biology
- Institutions: Stony Brook University

George Christopher Williams (May 12, 1926 – September 8, 2010) was an American evolutionary biologist.

Williams was a professor of biology at the State University of New York at Stony Brook who was best known for his vigorous critique of group selection. The work of Williams in this area, along with W. D. Hamilton, John Maynard Smith, Richard Dawkins, and others led to the development of the gene-centered view of evolution in the 1960s.

== Academic work ==
Williams's 1957 paper Pleiotropy, Natural Selection, and the Evolution of Senescence is one of the most influential in 20th-century evolutionary biology, and contains at least three foundational ideas. The central hypothesis of antagonistic pleiotropy remains the prevailing evolutionary explanation of senescence. In this paper, Williams was also the first to propose that senescence should be generally synchronized by natural selection. According to this original formulation

... if the adverse genic effects appeared earlier in one system than any other, they would be removed by selection from that system more readily than from any other. In other words, natural selection will always be in greatest opposition to the decline of the most senescence-prone system.

This important concept of synchrony of senescence was taken up a short time later by John Maynard Smith, and the origin of the idea is often misattributed to him, including in his obituary in the journal Nature. Finally, Williams's 1957 paper was the first to outline the "grandmother hypothesis". Williams's formulation stated that natural selection might select for menopause and post-reproductive life in females (though not explicitly mentioning grandchildren or the inclusive fitness contribution of grand-parenting).

In his first book, Adaptation and Natural Selection (1966), Williams advocated a "ground rule - or perhaps doctrine would be a better term - ... that adaptation is a special and onerous concept that should only be used where it is really necessary", and that, when it is necessary, selection among genes or individuals would in general be the preferable explanation for it. He elaborated this view in later books and papers, which contributed to the development of a gene-centered view of evolution. Richard Dawkins built upon Williams's ideas around selection and genes in his book The Selfish Gene (1976).

Williams was also well known for his work on the evolution of sex, and was an advocate of evolutionary medicine.

In Sex and Evolution (1975), he attempted to explain why many species use exclusive sexual reproduction despite its “twofold cost". He proposed several explanatory models ( “aphid-rotifer model,” the “strawberry-coral model,” and “elm-oyster model"), though found all of them insufficient. He even considered the possibility that sex is a maladaption for some species:

When major taxonomic groups all share a certain feature, it is unlikely that the feature has the same adaptive significance throughout the group. It may even be maladaptive for the majority... The fact that parthenogenesis or its equivalent, if found in a vertebrate population, has always replaced sexual reproduction entirely, is decisive evidence of the maladaptive nature of sexuality in these organisms. (Chapter 9)

In later books, including Natural Selection: Domains, Levels and Challenges, Williams softened his views on group selection, recognizing that clade selection, trait group selection and multilevel selection did sometimes occur in nature, something he had earlier thought to be so unlikely it could be safely ignored.

Williams became convinced that the genic neo-Darwinism of his earlier years, while essentially correct as a theory of microevolutionary change, could not account for evolutionary phenomena over longer time scales, and was thus an "utterly inadequate account of the evolution of the Earth's biota" (1992, p. 31). In particular, he became a staunch advocate of clade selection – a generalisation of species selection to monophyletic clades of any rank – which could potentially explain phenomena such as adaptive radiations, long-term phylogenetic trends, and biases in rates of speciation/extinction. In Natural Selection (1992), Williams argued that these phenomena cannot be explained by selectively-driven allele substitutions within populations, the evolutionary mechanism he had originally championed over all others. This book thus represents a substantial departure from the position of Adaptation and Natural Selection.

== Academic career ==
Williams received a Ph.D. in biology from the University of California at Los Angeles in 1955. At Stony Brook he taught courses in marine vertebrate zoology, and he often used ichthyological examples in his books.

In 1992, Williams was awarded the Daniel Giraud Elliot Medal from the National Academy of Sciences. He won the Crafoord Prize for Bioscience jointly with Ernst Mayr and John Maynard Smith in 1999. Richard Dawkins describes Williams as "one of the most respected of American evolutionary biologists".

== Books ==
- Williams, G.C. 1966. Adaptation and Natural Selection. Princeton University Press, Princeton, N.J.
- Williams, G.C., ed. 1971. Group Selection. Aldine-Atherton, Chicago.
- Williams, G.C. 1975. Sex and Evolution. Princeton University Press, Princeton, N.J.
- Paradis, J. and G.C. Williams. 1989. T.H. Huxley's Evolution and Ethics : with New Essays on its Victorian and Sociobiological Context. Princeton University Press, Princeton, N.J.
- Williams, G.C. 1992. Natural Selection: Domains, Levels, and Challenges. Oxford University Press, New York.
- Nesse, R.M. and G.C. Williams. 1994. Why We Get Sick : the New Science of Darwinian Medicine. Times Books, New York.
- Williams, G.C. 1996. Plan and Purpose in Nature. Weidenfeld & Nicolson, London (published in the U.S. in 1997 as The Pony Fish's Glow : and Other Clues to Plan and Purpose in Nature. Basic Books, New York).

== Selected papers ==
- Williams, G. C. (1957). "Pleiotropy, natural selection, and the evolution of senescence". Evolution. 11 (4): 398–411. doi:10.2307/2406060. JSTOR 2406060.
- Williams, G. C.; Williams, D. C. (1957). "Natural selection of individually harmful social adaptations among sibs with special reference to social insects". Evolution. 11 (1): 32–39. doi:10.2307/2405809. JSTOR 2405809.
- Williams, G. C. (1966). "Natural selection, the costs of reproduction, and a refinement of Lack's principle". The American Naturalist. 100 (916): 687–690. doi:10.1086/282461. JSTOR 2459305. S2CID 84993886.
- Williams, G. C.; Mitton, J. B. (1973). "Why reproduce sexually?". Journal of Theoretical Biology. 39 (3): 545–554. doi:10.1016/0022-5193(73)90067-2. PMID 4730017.
- Williams, G. C. (1979). "The question of adaptive sex ratio in outcrossed vertebrates". Proceedings of the Royal Society B: Biological Sciences. 205 (1161): 567–580. Bibcode:1979RSPSB.205..567W. doi:10.1098/rspb.1979.0085. JSTOR 77446. PMID 42061. S2CID 35775599.
- Hrdy, S. B.; Williams, G. C. (1983). "Behavioral biology and double standard". In Wasser, S. K. (ed.). Social Behavior of Female Vertebrates. New York, United States: Academic Press. pp. 3–17. ISBN 9780124313415.
- Taylor, P. O.; Williams, G. C. (1984). "Demographic parameters at evolutionary equilibrium". Canadian Journal of Zoology. 62 (11): 2264–2271. doi:10.1139/z84-329.
- Williams, G. C. (1985). "A defense of reductionism in evolutionary biology". In Dawkins, R.; Ridley, M. (eds.). Oxford Surveys in Evolutionary Biology: Volume 2. Oxford, United Kingdom: Oxford University Press. pp. 1–27. ISBN 9780198541745.
- Williams, G. C. (1988). "Huxley's Evolution and Ethics in Sociobiological Perspective". Zygon. 23 (4): 383–438. doi:10.1111/j.1467-9744.1988.tb00852.x.
- Williams, G. C.; Nesse, R. M. (1991). "The dawn of Darwinian medicine". The Quarterly Review of Biology. 66 (1): 1–22. doi:10.1086/417048. JSTOR 2830330. PMID 2052670. S2CID 40357032.
- Williams, G. C. (1992). "Gaia, nature worship and biocentric fallacies". The Quarterly Review of Biology. 67 (4): 479–486. doi:10.1086/417796. JSTOR 2832018. S2CID 84360055.
- Williams, G. C. (1993). "Mother nature is a wicked old witch". In Nitecki, M. H.; Nitecki, D. V. (eds.). Evolutionary Ethics. Albany, United States: SUNY Press. pp. 217–232. ISBN 9780791414996.
- Williams, G. C. (1999). "The Tithonus error in modern gerontology". The Quarterly Review of Biology. 74 (4): 405–415. doi:10.1086/394111. JSTOR 2664720. PMID 10672642. S2CID 83654243.
- Williams, G. C. (2008). "A package of information". In Brockman, J. (ed.). The Third Culture: Beyond The Scientific Revolution. New York, United States: Touchstone. pp. 38–50. ISBN 9780684823447.
- Williams, G. C. (2008). "Darwinian medicine". Encyclopedia of Life Sciences (ELS). Chichester, United Kingdom: John Wiley & Sons. doi:10.1002/9780470015902.a0001726.pub2. ISBN 978-0470016176.

== Controversy ==
Williams supervised an undergraduate project in 1985 which consisted of a student, Mitchell Behm, tossing live animals into tubs with domesticated ferrets, which Behm subsequently admitted he partly did "for his own amusement." Dr. Charles Middleton, Director of the Division of Laboratory Animal Resources stated, "If animals are just going to tear each other up, the experiment would not have been approved." Ferrets were illegal in New York at the time, without a license, which neither individual had.

After police investigation, Williams received a formal reprimand from SUNY Stony Brook for never receiving approval because of not detailing the pain of the animals involved, and for allowing non-campus animals to participate. Because the statute of limitations had expired, Williams narrowly escaped strict disciplinary action, in addition to criminal prosecution. Dr. Mark Lerman, medical director of Lifeline for Wildlife said there was no justification and that the experiment was completely useless.

The experiments were in direct violation of the Animal Welfare Act of 1966 and its PHS policy amendment introducing the Institutional Animal Care and Use Committee model, to which SUNY and all of its researchers were subject in 1988.
