= Genetic anthropomorphism =

In evolutionary biology, genetic anthropomorphism refers to "thinking like a gene". The central question is "if I were a gene, what would I do in order to reproduce myself". The question is an obvious fallacy since genes are incapable of thought. However, natural selection does act in such a way that those that are most successful at reproducing themselves (by following the optimum strategy) prosper. Thinking like a gene enables the results to be visualised. This is related to a philosophical tool known as the intentional stance.

The most notable genetic anthropomorphist was the British biologist, W. D. Hamilton. Hamilton's friend, Richard Dawkins, popularised the idea.

Genetic anthropomorphism stands in contrast to positioning organisms or populations as the agents, or to not providing anthropomorphism of any component of evolution.

== Criticism ==
Anthropomorphism is controversial.
