= The Selfish Gene =

1976 book by Richard Dawkins

- Original cover, with detail from the painting The Expectant Valley by the zoologist Desmond Morris
- Author: Richard Dawkins
- Language: English
- Subject: Evolutionary biology
- Publisher: Oxford University Press
- Publication date: 1976; Second edition in 1989; Third edition in 2006; Fourth edition in 2016
- Publication place: United Kingdom
- Media type: Print
- Pages: 224
- ISBN: 0-19-857519-X
- OCLC: 2681149
- Followed by: The Extended Phenotype

The Selfish Gene is a 1976 popular science book by Richard Dawkins that espouses the gene-centred view of evolution. It builds upon the thesis of George Christopher Williams's Adaptation and Natural Selection (1966) and W. D. Hamilton's work on kin selection. From the gene-centred view, it follows that the more genes two individuals share, the more sense it makes for them to co-operate.

The book introduced the term meme for a unit of cultural evolution analogous to the gene. Memetics has become a subject in its own right in the years since. In popularising Hamilton's ideas, as well as making its own valuable contributions to the field, the book has also stimulated research on human inclusive fitness.

The "selfish gene" is a metaphor for the gene-centred view of evolution. As such, the book is not about a particular gene that causes selfish behaviour; in fact, much of it is devoted to explaining the evolution of altruism. Dawkins says that the title "might give an inadequate impression" of the book's topic and in retrospect wishes he had taken Tom Maschler's advice and titled it The Immortal Gene. He laments that many people "read it by title only." In response, he expanded on the evolution of altruism in the BBC documentary Nice Guys Finish First.

== Background ==
Dawkins builds upon George Christopher Williams's book Adaptation and Natural Selection (1966), which argued that altruism is not based upon group benefit per se, but results from selection that occurs "at the level of the gene mediated by the phenotype" and that any selection at the group level occurred only under rare circumstances. W. D. Hamilton and others developed this approach further during the 1960s; they opposed the concepts of group selection and of selection aimed directly at benefit to the individual organism:

Despite the principle of 'survival of the fittest' the ultimate criterion which determines whether [a gene] G will spread is not whether the behavior is to the benefit of the behaver, but whether it is to the benefit of the gene G ...With altruism this will happen only if the affected individual is a relative of the altruist, therefore having an increased chance of carrying the gene.

— W. D. Hamilton, The Evolution of Altruistic Behavior (1963)

The book's central metaphor is a means of explicating the gene-centred view of evolution.

== Book ==
=== Title ===
Dawkins recalls showing The Selfish Gene to Tom Maschler, who "liked the book but not the title". He suggested The Immortal Gene. Dawkins writes that "Maschler may have been right. Many critics, especially vociferous ones learned in philosophy as I have discovered, prefer to read a book by title only. No doubt this works well enough for The Tale of Benjamin Bunny or The Decline and Fall of the Roman Empire, but I can readily see that ‘The Selfish Gene’ on its own, without the large footnote of the book itself, might give an inadequate impression of its contents."

=== Contents ===
1. Why Are People?

Dawkins writes that "Intelligent life on a planet comes of age when it first works out the reason for its own existence. ... Living organisms had existed on earth, without ever knowing why, for over three thousand million years before the truth finally dawned on one of them. His name was Charles Darwin." Darwin (and Alfred Russel Wallace, working independently) discovered the mechanism of evolution: natural selection.

2. The Replicators

Dawkins introduces the term replicator to describe self-replicating molecules like DNA and RNA. He considers the origin of life with the emergence of replicators. The original replicator was the first molecule which managed to reproduce itself and thus gained an advantage over other molecules within the primordial soup. As replicating molecules became more complex, Dawkins postulates, they evolved cells serving as survival machines. Cells joined to form bodies.

3. Immortal Coils

Dawkins expands on DNA, its helical structure and its organisation into chromosomes. Genes are DNA segments which are translated into proteins. Darwin’s coeval Gregor Mendel worked out the laws of inheritance and found that traits are inherited as discrete units. In meiosis, the production of gametes, genes are recombined during crossing over. The individual organism is analogized to a boat of rowers that must each work together to travel. The average performance of each gene, in the environment formed by the other genes, determines how prevalent it will be in the next generations. Dawkins mentions Medawar's selection shadow theory of aging, which states that the selection pressure declines as an organism ages past reproductive maturity, for a gene that's lethal earlier in life prevents all future chance of reproduction, while a gene lethal in old age will affect the number of offspring less. Dawkins also raises the question of how sex and chromosomal crossover evolved, suggesting that the fact that only half of the genes of an individual are passed down through sexual reproduction poses less of a problem when one considers the genes for sexuality or crossover as selfishly manipulating the other genes for its own ends.

4. The Gene Machine

Dawkins discusses the evolution of behaviour. Genes encoding behaviours that cause those genes to be passed on will naturally be selected for. He provides various examples.

5. Aggression

Dawkins discusses John Maynard Smith’s evolutionarily stable strategy, "a strategy which, if most members of a population adopt it, cannot be bettered by an alternative strategy … once an ESS is achieved it will stay: selection will penalize any deviation from it." He gives the example of the hawk-dove game, where aggressive 'hawks' and non-aggressive 'doves' (which pretend to be aggressive) compete for some resource, with the hawks suffering severe losses against other hawks while gaining advantage against doves, and with doves suffering small losses against other doves (due to time wasted posturing until one eventually backs down). Even though both hawk and dove are Nash equilibria neither are evolutionarily stable, with the evolutionarily stable strategy being an intermediate ratio of 'hawks' (aggressors) and 'doves' (nonaggressors). This illustrates how evolution does not work for the 'good of the species', as the species on average would benefit more if every member was dove (and benefit the most on average at a different ratio with less hawks). In the presence of some uncorrelated asymmetry, like which member is the intruder or the defender of territory, the mixed ratio is no longer an evolutionarily stable strategy - instead the stable strategy is to play hawk when defending and dove when intruding or vice versa. In real life, there is usually some advantage to defending, which makes that become the equilibria present. Furthermore, if intruders played hawk and defenders played dove, then there would be an incentive to try to be the intruder and thus to move around all the time, wasting resources. Dawkins, however, provides an example of a spider species that in fact flees when another intrudes, leading to a chain of evictions.

6. Genesmanship

Dawkins discusses kin selection: "Close relatives – kin – have a greater than average chance of sharing genes. It has long been clear that this must be why altruism by parents toward their young is so common. What R. A. Fisher, J. B. S. Haldane and especially W. D. Hamilton realized was that the same applies to other close relations—brothers and sisters, nephews and nieces, close cousins. If an individual dies in order to save ten close relatives, one copy of the kin-altruism gene may be lost, but a larger number of copies of the gene is saved."

7. Family Planning

Dawkins discusses David Lack’s principle. Natural selection, according to Lack, adjusts initial clutch size so as to take maximum advantage of these limited resources.

8. Battle of the Generations

Dawkins discusses R. L. Trivers’s concept of parental investment, "any investment by the parent in an individual offspring that increases the offspring’s chance of surviving (and hence reproductive success) at the cost of the parent’s ability to invest in other offspring".

9. Battle of the Sexes

Dawkins discusses Darwin’s theory of sexual selection. Females can afford to be choosy in their mates, and select for attractive traits in males. Fisher's principle explains why a 50:50 ratio of males to females is evolutionarily stable. This is true even in an extreme case like the harem-keeping elephant seal, where 4% of the males get 88% of copulations. In that case, the strategy of having a female offspring is safe, as she will have a pup, but the strategy of having a male can bring a large return (dozens of pups), even though many males live out their lives as bachelors.

10. You Scratch My back, I’ll Ride on Yours

Dawkins discusses reciprocal altruism. Amotz Zahavi's theory of honest signalling explains stotting as a selfish act that improves the springbok's chances of escaping from a predator by indicating how difficult the chase would be. Dawkins discusses why many species live in groups, achieving mutual benefits through mechanisms such as Hamilton's selfish herd model: each individual behaves selfishly but the result is herd behaviour. Altruism can evolve, as in the social insects such as ants and bees, where workers give up the right to reproduce in favour of a sister, the queen; in their case, the unusual (haplodiploid) system of sex determination may have helped to bring this about, as females in a nest are exceptionally closely related.

11. Memes

Dawkins discusses cultural evolution, which is in some ways analogous to biological evolution. Dawkins proposes that units of information can propagate themselves like genes. "The new soup is the soup of human culture. We need a name for the new replicator or a unit of imitation. ‘Mimeme’ comes from a suitable Greek root, but I want a monosyllable that sounds a bit like ‘gene’. I hope my classicist friends will forgive me if I abbreviate mimeme to meme. If it is any consolation, it could alternatively be thought of as being related to ’memory’, or to the French word même. It should be pronounced to rhyme with ‘cream’."

== Reception ==
The Selfish Gene was extremely popular when published and it remains widely read. Proponents argue that the central point, that replicating the gene is the object of selection, usefully completes and extends Darwin's explanation of evolution. Peter Medawar wrote that it is "a most skillful reformulation of the central problems of social biology in terms of the genetical theory of natural selection. Beyond this, it is learned, witty and very well written." W. D. Hamilton wrote that "The book should be read, can be read, by almost anyone. It describes with great skill a new face of the theory of evolution." John Maynard Smith writes that "The Selfish Gene was unusual in that, although written as a popular account, it made an original contribution to biology."

The New York Times wrote "it's the kind of science writing that makes the reader feel like a genius." Tim Radford, reviewing it in 2012, wrote that "To re-read it is to be reminded of what an extraordinary achievement it was."

Ian McEwan writes "It hastened a sea change in evolutionary theory, it affected profoundly the teaching of biology, it enticed an enthusiastic younger generation into the subject, and spawned a huge literature, and eventually a new discipline - memetics. At the same time, and this is the measure of its achievement, it addressed itself without condescension to the layman. It did so provocatively, and with style."

=== Critiques ===
According to the psychologist Nicky Hayes, "Dawkins presented a version of sociobiology that rested heavily on metaphors drawn from animal behaviour, and extrapolated these...One of the weaknesses of the sociological approach is that it tends only to seek confirmatory examples from among the huge diversity of animal behaviour. Dawkins did not deviate from this tradition." More generally, critics argue that The Selfish Gene oversimplifies the relationship between genes and the organism.

In 1976 the ecologist Arthur Cain, one of Dawkins's tutors at Oxford in the 1960s, called it a "young man's book", a quote of a critique of the New College, Oxford (Note: Dawkins's college.) philosopher A. J. Ayer's Language, Truth, and Logic (1936). Dawkins noted that he had been "flattered by the comparison, [but] knew that Ayer had recanted much of his first book and [he] could hardly miss Cain's pointed implication that [he] should, in the fullness of time, do the same." The philosopher Mary Midgley mused that "This hasn't occurred to Dawkins. He goes on saying the same thing." However, according to Wilkins and Hull, Dawkins's thinking has developed:

In Dawkins's early writings, replicators and vehicles played different but complementary and equally important roles in selection, but as Dawkins honed his view of the evolutionary process, vehicles became less and less fundamental...In later writings Dawkins goes even further and argues that phenotypic traits are what really matter in selection and that they can be treated independently of their being organized into vehicles...Thus, it comes as no surprise when Dawkins proclaims that he "coined the term 'vehicle' not to praise it but to bury it." As prevalent as organisms might be, as determinate as the causal roles that they play in selection are, reference to them can and must be omitted from any perspicuous characterization of selection in the evolutionary process. Dawkins is far from a genetic determinist, but he is certainly a genetic reductionist.

— John S Wilkins, David Hull, Dawkins on Replicators and Vehicles, The Stanford Encyclopedia of Philosophy

As to the unit of selection, Stephen Jay Gould, in The Structure of Evolutionary Theory, finds Dawkins's position tries to have it both ways:

Dawkins claims to prefer genes and to find greater insight in this formulation. But he allows that you or I might prefer organisms—and it really doesn't matter.

=== Choice of words ===
A good deal of objection to The Selfish Gene stemmed from its failure to be always clear about "selection" and "replication". Dawkins says the gene is the fundamental unit of selection, and then points out that selection does not act directly upon the gene, but upon "vehicles" or '"extended phenotypes". Stephen Jay Gould took exception to calling the gene a 'unit of selection' because selection acted only upon phenotypes. Summarising the Dawkins-Gould difference of view, Sterelny says:

Gould thinks gene differences do not cause evolutionary changes in populations, they register those changes.

The word "cause" here is somewhat tricky: does a change in lottery rules (for example, inheriting a defective gene "responsible" for a disorder) "cause" differences in outcome that might or might not occur? It certainly alters the likelihood of events, but a concatenation of contingencies decides what actually occurs. Dawkins thinks the use of "cause" as a statistical weighting is acceptable in common usage. Like Gould, Gabriel Dover in criticising The Selfish Gene says:

It is illegitimate to give 'powers' to genes, as Dawkins would have it, to control the outcome of selection...There are no genes for interactions, as such: rather, each unique set of inherited genes contributes interactively to one unique phenotype...the true determinants of selection.

However, from a comparison with Dawkins's discussion of this very same point, it would seem both Gould's and Dover's comments are more a critique of his sloppy usage than a difference of views. Hull suggested a resolution based upon a distinction between replicators and interactors.

Andrew Brown has written:

"Selfish", when applied to genes, doesn't mean "selfish" at all. It means, instead, an extremely important quality for which there is no good word in the English language: "the quality of being copied by a Darwinian selection process." This is a complicated mouthful. There ought to be a better, shorter word—but "selfish" isn't it.

Donald Symons also finds it inappropriate to use anthropomorphism in conveying scientific meaning in general, and particularly in this instance. He writes in The Evolution of Human Sexuality (1979):

In summary, the rhetoric of The Selfish Gene exactly reverses the real situation: through [the use of] metaphor genes are endowed with properties only sentient beings can possess, such as selfishness, while sentient beings are stripped of these properties and called machines...The anthropomorphism of genes...obscures the deepest mystery in the life sciences: the origin and nature of mind.

== Influence ==
=== Selfish genetic elements ===
Francis Crick and Leslie Orgel introduced the term “selfish genetic element” to describe replicators that spread through the genome at their host's expense. Ford Doolittle and Carmen Sapienza used "selfish gene" to describe the phenomena shortly thereafter.

=== Memes ===
The psychologist Susan Blackmore wrote The Meme Machine (2000), with a foreword by Dawkins. James Gleick describes Dawkins's meme as "his most famous and memorable invention".

The Selfish Gene popularised sociobiology in Japan after its translation in 1980. The "meme" entered the country's consciousness. Yuzuru Tanaka of Hokkaido University wrote Meme Media and Meme Market Architectures. The information scientist Osamu Sakura has published a book in Japanese and several papers in English on the topic. Nippon Animation produced the educational series The Many Dream Journeys of Meme.

== Publication ==
The Selfish Gene was first published by Oxford University Press in 1976 in eleven chapters with a preface by the author and a foreword by Robert Trivers. A second edition was published in 1989. This edition added two new chapters and substantial endnotes to the preceding chapters, reflecting thoughts from The Extended Phenotype. It also added a second preface by the author, but the original foreword by Trivers was dropped. The book has been translated into at least 23 languages including Arabic, Thai and Turkish.

In 2006 a 30th-anniversary edition was published with the Trivers foreword and a new introduction by the author in which he states, "This edition does, however---and it is a source of particular joy to me---restore the original Foreword by Robert Trivers." This edition was accompanied by a festschrift entitled Richard Dawkins: How a Scientist Changed the Way We Think (2006). In March 2006 a special event entitled The Selfish Gene: Thirty Years On was held at the London School of Economics. In March 2011 Audible published an audiobook edition narrated by Dawkins and his wife at the time, the actress Lalla Ward.

In 2016 Oxford University Press published The Extended Selfish Gene, a 40th-anniversary edition with a new epilogue in which Dawkins discusses the endurance of the gene's eye view of evolution and states that it, along with coalescence analysis "illuminates the deep past in ways of which I had no inkling when I first wrote The Selfish Gene..." It contains two chapters from The Extended Phenotype. He thanks Yan Wong, "my co-author of The Ancestor's Tale, from whom I learned everything I know about coalescence theory and much else besides."

=== Editions ===
Year	Title	ISBN	Format
1976	The Selfish Gene (1st ed.)	978-0-19-857519-1	Hardback
1978	The Selfish Gene (Scientific Book Club ed.)	[ISBN unspecified]	Hardback
1978	The Selfish Gene (1st ed. Reprint)	978-0-19-520000-3	Paperback
1989	The Selfish Gene (2nd ed.)	978-0-19-286092-7	Paperback
2006	The Selfish Gene: 30th Anniversary Edition (3rd ed.)	978-0-19-929114-4	Hardback
2006	The Selfish Gene: 30th Anniversary Edition (3rd ed.)	978-0-19-929115-1	Paperback
2011	The Selfish Gene (MP3 CD)	978-1-49-151450-4	Audiobook
2016	The Selfish Gene: 40th Anniversary Edition (4th ed.)	978-0-19-878860-7	Paperback
2016	The 'Extended' Selfish Gene (4th ed.)	978-0-19-878878-2	Hardback
2026	The Selfish Gene: 50th Anniversary Edition (5th ed.)	978-0-19-898537-2	Hardback
2026	The Selfish Gene: 50th Anniversary Edition (5th ed.)	978-0-19-898538-9	Paperback

== Awards and recognition ==
In July 2017 a poll to celebrate the 30th anniversary of the Royal Society Science Book Prize listed The Selfish Gene as the most influential science book of all time.

The Royal Institution conducted a poll to determine the best science book ever. The Selfish Gene made the shortlist, along with Tom Stoppard's Arcadia, Konrad Lorenz's King Solomon's Ring and, in first place, Primo Levi's The Periodic Table.

Ian McEwan writes that it "stood at the beginning of a golden age of science writing. With a fine sense of literary tradition, the physicist Steven Weinberg, in his book Dreams of a Final Theory, revisited Huxley's lecture on chalk in order to make the case for reductionism. Steven Pinker's application of Darwinian thought to Chomskyan linguistics in The Language Instinct is one of the finest celebrations of language I know. Among many other indispensable 'classics', I would propose EO Wilson's The Diversity of Life on the ecological wonders of the Amazon rain forest, and on the teeming micro-organisms in a handful of soil; David Deutsch's masterly account of the Many Worlds theory in The Fabric of Reality; Jared Diamond's melding of history with biological thought in Guns, Germs and Steel..."

Weinberg included it on his list of the 13 best science books for the general reader.

== See also ==
- The Making of the Fittest (2006) by Sean B. Carroll, a book about evidence for evolution from genomics
- Non-cooperative game – Type of game involving individual competition
- Selfish DNA – Genetic segments that can enhance their own transmission at the expense of other genes
- Evolutionarily stable strategy – Solution concept in game theory
- Green-beard effect – Hypothesis for altruism in evolutionary biology
- Nice Guys Finish First (1986), BBC documentary on evolution of altruism

== Bibliography ==
- Dawkins, Richard (1976). The Selfish Gene. Oxford: Oxford University Press. ISBN 978-0-19-286092-7.
- Dawkins, Richard (1989). The Selfish Gene (second ed.). Oxford: Oxford University Press. ISBN 978-0-19-217773-5.
- Dawkins, Richard (2006). The Selfish Gene (30th anniversary ed.). Oxford: Oxford University Press. ISBN 978-0-19-929115-1. Archived from the original on 4 May 2006. The Selfish Gene at Google Books
- Grafen, Alan; Ridley, Mark, eds. (2006). Richard Dawkins: How a Scientist Changed the Way We Think. Oxford: Oxford University Press. ISBN 978-0-19-929116-8.
- Ridley, Matt (28 January 2016). "In Retrospect: The Selfish Gene". Nature. 529 (7587): 462–463. Bibcode:2016Natur.529..462R. doi:10.1038/529462a.
