= Gene-centered view of evolution =

Theory of the "selfish gene"

The gene-centered view of evolution, also known as the selfish gene theory, (Note: Other names include the gene selection theory and the gene's eye view.) holds that adaptive evolution occurs through the differential survival of competing genes, increasing the allele frequency of those alleles whose phenotypic trait effects successfully promote their own propagation. The proponents of this viewpoint argue that, since heritable information is passed from generation to generation almost exclusively by DNA, natural selection and evolution are best considered from the perspective of genes.

Proponents of the gene-centered viewpoint argue that it permits understanding of diverse phenomena such as altruism and intragenomic conflict that are otherwise difficult to explain from an organism-centered viewpoint. Some proponents claim that the gene-centered view is the aspect of evolutionary theory that is the most empirically validated, has the greatest predictive power, and has the broadest applicability.

The gene-centered view of evolution is a synthesis of the theory of evolution by natural selection, the particulate inheritance theory, and the rejection of transmission of acquired characters. It states that those alleles whose phenotypic effects successfully promote their own propagation will be favorably selected relative to their competitor alleles within the population. This process produces adaptations for the benefit of alleles that promote the reproductive success of the organism, or of other organisms containing the same allele (kin altruism and green-beard effects), or even its own propagation relative to the other genes within the same organism (selfish genes and intragenomic conflict).

Opponents of the gene-centered view argue that it is too narrowly focused on adaptation as the only important mechanism of evolution. Thus, it ignores the possibility that traits might be neutral and fixed by random genetic drift. It also ignores the possibility that some fixed traits might even be deleterious. Critics argue that proponents of the gene-centered view often favor an adaptationist perspective that assumes a role for natural selection as the null hypothesis.

== Overview ==
The gene-centered view of evolution is a model for the evolution of social characteristics such as selfishness and altruism, with gene defined as "not just one single physical bit of DNA [but] all replicas of a particular bit of DNA distributed throughout the world".

=== Acquired characteristics ===
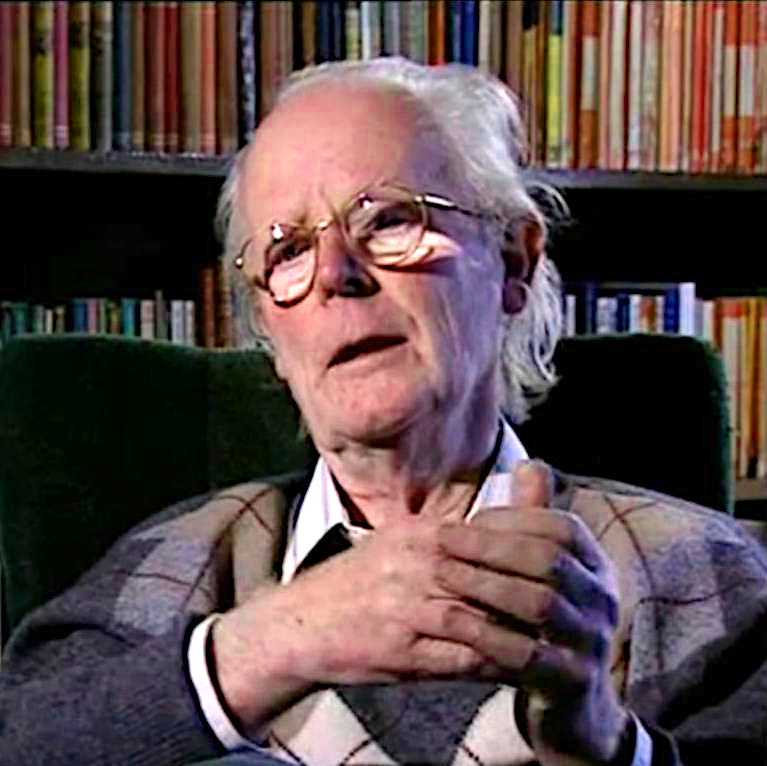
John Maynard Smith

The formulation of the central dogma of molecular biology was summarized by Maynard Smith:

If the central dogma is true, and if it is also true that nucleic acids are the only means whereby information is transmitted between generations, this has crucial implications for evolution. It would imply that all evolutionary novelty requires changes in nucleic acids, and that these changes – mutations – are essentially accidental and non-adaptive in nature. Changes elsewhere – in the egg cytoplasm, in materials transmitted through the placenta, in the mother's milk – might alter the development of the child, but, unless the changes were in nucleic acids, they would have no long-term evolutionary effects.

— Maynard Smith

The rejection of the inheritance of acquired characters, combined with Ronald Fisher the statistician, giving the subject a mathematical footing, and showing how Mendelian genetics was compatible with natural selection in his 1930 book The Genetical Theory of Natural Selection. J. B. S. Haldane, and Sewall Wright, paved the way to the formulation of the selfish-gene theory. For cases where environment can influence heredity, see epigenetics.

=== The gene as the unit of selection ===
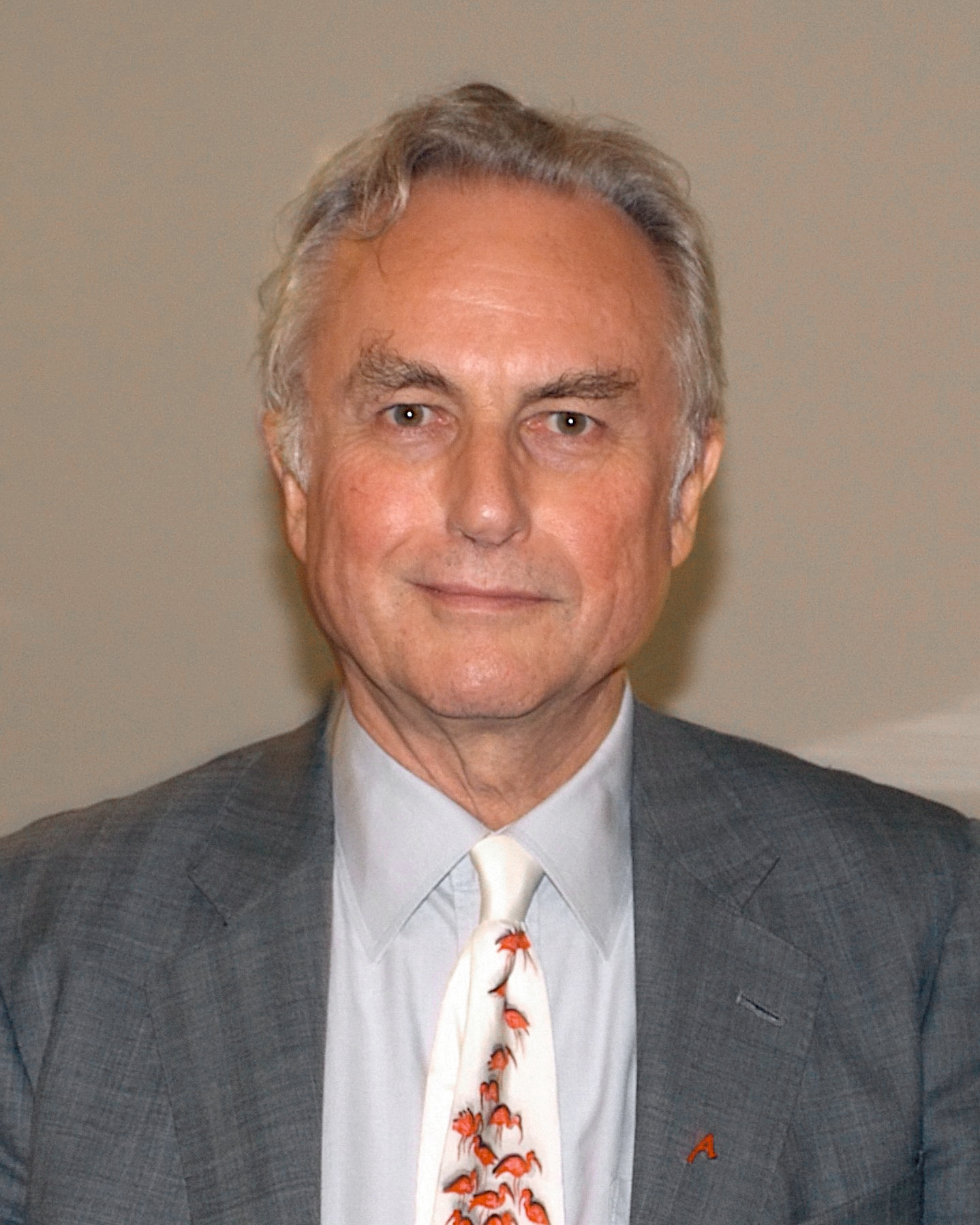
Richard Dawkins

The view of the gene as the unit of selection was developed mainly in the works of Richard Dawkins, W. D. Hamilton, Colin Pittendrigh and George C. Williams. It was popularized by Dawkins in his book The Selfish Gene (1976).

According to Williams' 1966 book Adaptation and Natural Selection,

[t]he essence of the genetical theory of natural selection is a statistical bias in the relative rates of survival of alternatives (genes, individuals, etc.). The effectiveness of such bias in producing adaptation is contingent on the maintenance of certain quantitative relationships among the operative factors. One necessary condition is that the selected entity must have a high degree of permanence and a low rate of endogenous change, relative to the degree of bias (differences in selection coefficients).

— Williams, 1966, pp. 22–23

Williams argued that "[t]he natural selection of phenotypes cannot in itself produce cumulative change, because phenotypes are extremely temporary manifestations." Each phenotype is the unique product of the interaction between genome and environment. It does not matter how fit and fertile a phenotype is, it will eventually be destroyed and will never be duplicated.

Since 1954, it has been known that DNA is the main physical substrate to genetic information, and it is capable of high-fidelity replication through many generations. So, a particular gene coded in a nucleobase sequence of a lineage of replicated DNA molecules can have a high permanence and a low rate of endogenous change.

In normal sexual reproduction, an entire genome is the unique combination of father's and mother's chromosomes produced at the moment of fertilization. It is generally destroyed with its organism, because "meiosis and recombination destroy genotypes as surely as death." Only half of it is transmitted to each descendant due to independent segregation.

And the high prevalence of horizontal gene transfer in bacteria and archaea means that genomic combinations of these asexually reproducing groups are also transient in evolutionary time: "The traditional view, that prokaryotic evolution can be understood primarily in terms of clonal divergence and periodic selection, must be augmented to embrace gene exchange as a creative force."

The gene as an informational entity persists for an evolutionarily significant span of time through a lineage of many physical copies.

In his book River out of Eden, Dawkins coins the phrase God's utility function to explain his view on genes as units of selection. He uses this phrase as a synonym of the "meaning of life" or the "purpose of life". By rephrasing the word purpose in terms of what economists call a utility function, meaning "that which is maximized", Dawkins attempts to reverse-engineer the purpose in the mind of the Divine Engineer of Nature, or the utility function of god. Finally, Dawkins argues that it is a mistake to assume that an ecosystem or a species as a whole exists for a purpose. (Note: The use of anthropomorphic shorthand is a way of describing the action of a Darwinian unit of selection by attributing anthropomorphic qualities to the unit, such as purpose, selfishness, build, exploit, discard etc. as well as actions such as promote, compete, etc. On a genetic level, units of selection do not possess these anthropomorphic attributes, and a proper description will describe the process of propagation and selection in mechanistic terms. The proper scientific description is often more wordy than the anthropomorphic shorthand, however, it should be used carefully to avoid misconceptions which may arise from extending the analogy too far.) He writes that it is incorrect to suppose that individual organisms lead a meaningful life either; in nature, only genes have a utility function – to perpetuate their own existence with indifference to great sufferings inflicted upon the organisms they build, exploit and discard.

=== Organisms as vehicles ===
Genes are usually packed together inside a genome, which is itself contained inside an organism. Genes group together into genomes because "genetic replication makes use of energy and substrates that are supplied by the metabolic economy in much greater quantities than would be possible without a genetic division of labour." They build vehicles to promote their mutual interests of jumping into the next generation of vehicles. As Dawkins puts it, organisms are the "survival machines" of genes.

The phenotypic effect of a particular gene is contingent on its environment, including the fellow genes constituting with it the total genome. A gene never has a fixed effect, so how is it possible to speak of a gene for long legs? It is because of the phenotypic differences between alleles. One may say that one allele, all other things being equal or varying within certain limits, causes greater legs than its alternative. This difference enables the scrutiny of natural selection.

"A gene can have multiple phenotypic effects, each of which may be of positive, negative or neutral value. It is the net selective value of a gene's phenotypic effect that determines the fate of the gene." For instance, a gene can cause its bearer to have greater reproductive success at a young age, but also cause a greater likelihood of death at a later age. If the benefit outweighs the harm, averaged out over the individuals and environments in which the gene happens to occur, then phenotypes containing the gene will generally be positively selected and thus the abundance of that gene in the population will increase.

Even so, it becomes necessary to model the genes in combination with their vehicle as well as in combination with the vehicle's environment.

== Selfish-gene theory ==
The selfish-gene theory of natural selection can be restated as follows:

Genes do not present themselves naked to the scrutiny of natural selection, instead they present their phenotypic effects. [...] Differences in genes give rise to differences in these phenotypic effects. Natural selection acts on the phenotypic differences and thereby on genes. Thus genes come to be represented in successive generations in proportion to the selective value of their phenotypic effects.

— Cronin, 1991, p. 60

The result is that "the prevalent genes in a sexual population must be those that, as a mean condition, through a large number of genotypes in a large number of situations, have had the most favourable phenotypic effects for their own replication." In other words, we expect selfish genes ("selfish" meaning that it promotes its own survival without necessarily promoting the survival of the organism, group or even species). This theory implies that adaptations are the phenotypic effects of genes to maximize their representation in future generations. An adaptation is maintained by selection if it promotes genetic survival directly, or else some subordinate goal that ultimately contributes to successful reproduction.

=== Individual altruism and genetic egoism ===
The gene is a unit of hereditary information that exists in many physical copies in the world, and which particular physical copy will be replicated and originate new copies does not matter from the gene's point of view. A selfish gene could be favored by selection by producing altruism among organisms containing it. The idea is summarized as follows:

If a gene copy confers a benefit B on another vehicle at cost C to its own vehicle, its costly action is strategically beneficial if pB > C, where p is the probability that a copy of the gene is present in the vehicle that benefits. Actions with substantial costs therefore require significant values of p. Two kinds of factors ensure high values of p: relatedness (kinship) and recognition (green beards).

— Haig, 1997, p. 288

A gene in a somatic cell of an individual may forgo replication to promote the transmission of its copies in the germ line cells. It ensures the high value of p = 1 due to their constant contact and their common origin from the zygote.

The kin selection theory predicts that a gene may promote the recognition of kinship by historical continuity: a mammalian mother learns to identify her own offspring in the act of giving birth; a male preferentially directs resources to the offspring of mothers with whom he has copulated; the other chicks in a nest are siblings; and so on. The expected altruism between kin is calibrated by the value of p, also known as the coefficient of relatedness. For instance, an individual has a p = 1/2 in relation to his brother, and p = 1/8 to his cousin, so we would expect, ceteris paribus, greater altruism among brothers than among cousins. In this vein, geneticist J. B. S. Haldane famously joked, "Would I lay down my life to save my brother? No, but I would to save two brothers or eight cousins." However, examining the human propensity for altruism, kin selection theory seems incapable of explaining cross-familiar, cross-racial and even cross-species acts of kindness, to which Richard Dawkins wrote:

Lay critics frequently bring up some apparently maladaptive feature of modern human behaviour—adoption, say, or contraception [...] The question, about the adaptive significance of behaviour in an artificial world, should never have been put [...] A useful analogy here is one that I heard from R. D. Alexander. Moths fly into candle flames, and this does nothing to help their inclusive fitness [...] We asked 'Why do moths fly into candle flames?' and were puzzled. If we had characterized the behaviour differently and asked ‘Why do moths maintain a fixed angle to light rays (a habit which incidentally causes them to spiral into the light source if the rays happen not to be parallel)?’, we should not have been so puzzled.

— Dawkins, 1982, chapter 3

=== Green-beard effect ===
Green-beard effects gained their name from a thought-experiment first presented by Bill Hamilton and then popularized and given its current name by Richard Dawkins who considered the possibility of a gene that caused its possessors to develop a green beard and to be nice to other green-bearded individuals. Since then, "green-beard effect" has come to refer to forms of genetic self-recognition in which a gene in one individual might direct benefits to other individuals that possess the gene. Such genes would be especially selfish, benefiting themselves regardless of the fates of their vehicles. Since then, green-beard genes have been discovered in nature, such as Gp-9 in fire ants (Solenopsis invicta), csA in social amoeba (Dictyostelium discoideum), and FLO1 in budding yeast (Saccharomyces cerevisiae).

== Intragenomic conflict ==
As genes are capable of producing individual altruism, they are capable of producing conflict among genes inside the genome of one individual. This phenomenon is called intragenomic conflict and arises when one gene promotes its own replication in detriment to other genes in the genome. The classic example is segregation distorter genes that cheat during meiosis or gametogenesis and end up in more than half of the functional gametes. These genes can persist in a population even when their transmission results in reduced fertility. Egbert Leigh compared the genome to "a parliament of genes: each acts in its own self-interest, but if its acts hurt the others, they will combine together to suppress it" to explain the relative low occurrence of intragenomic conflict.

== Price equation ==
The Price equation is a covariance equation that is a mathematical description of evolution and natural selection. The Price equation was derived by George R. Price, working to rederive W. D. Hamilton's work on kin selection.

== Advocates ==
Besides Richard Dawkins and George C. Williams, other biologists and philosophers have expanded and refined the selfish-gene theory, such as John Maynard Smith, George R. Price, Robert Trivers, David Haig, Helena Cronin, David Hull, Philip Kitcher, and Daniel C. Dennett.

== Criticisms ==
The gene-centric view has been opposed by Ernst Mayr, Stephen Jay Gould, David Sloan Wilson, and philosopher Elliott Sober. An alternative, multilevel selection (MLS), has been advocated by E. O. Wilson, David Sloan Wilson, Sober, Richard E. Michod, and Samir Okasha.

Writing in the New York Review of Books, Gould has characterized the gene-centered perspective as confusing book-keeping with causality. Gould views selection as working on many levels, and has called attention to a hierarchical perspective of selection. Gould also called the claims of Selfish Gene "strict adaptationism", "ultra-Darwinism", and "Darwinian fundamentalism", describing them as excessively "reductionist". He saw the theory as leading to a simplistic "algorithmic" theory of evolution, or even to the re-introduction of a teleological principle. Mayr went so far as to say "Dawkins' basic theory of the gene being the object of evolution is totally non-Darwinian."

Gould also addressed the issue of selfish genes in his essay "Caring groups and selfish genes". Gould acknowledged that Dawkins was not imputing conscious action to genes, but simply using a shorthand metaphor commonly found in evolutionary writings. To Gould, the fatal flaw was that "no matter how much power Dawkins wishes to assign to genes, there is one thing that he cannot give them – direct visibility to natural selection." Rather, the unit of selection is the phenotype, not the genotype, because it is phenotypes that interact with the environment at the natural-selection interface. So, in Kim Sterelny's summation of Gould's view, "gene differences do not cause evolutionary changes in populations, they register those changes." Richard Dawkins replied to this criticism in a later book, The Extended Phenotype, that Gould confused particulate genetics with particulate embryology, stating that genes do "blend", as far as their effects on developing phenotypes are concerned, but that they do not blend as they replicate and recombine down the generations.

Since Gould's death in 2002, Niles Eldredge has continued with counter-arguments to gene-centered natural selection. Eldredge notes that in Dawkins' book A Devil's Chaplain, which was published just before Eldredge's book, "Richard Dawkins comments on what he sees as the main difference between his position and that of the late Stephen Jay Gould. He concludes that it is his own vision that genes play a causal role in evolution," while Gould (and Eldredge) "sees genes as passive recorders of what worked better than what".

== See also ==
- Evolutionary biology
- Genetic anthropomorphism
- Richard Dawkins

== Sources ==
- Crick, F. (1970). "Central dogma of molecular biology". Nature. 227 (5258): 561–563. Bibcode:1970Natur.227..561C. doi:10.1038/227561a0. PMID 4913914. S2CID 4164029.
- Darwin, C.; Wallace, A. (July 1858). "On the Tendency of Species to form Varieties; and on the Perpetuation of Varieties and Species by Natural Means of Selection". Proceedings of Linnean Society. 3 (9): 45–62. doi:10.1111/j.1096-3642.1858.tb02500.x.
- Dawkins, R. (1982) "Replicators and Vehicles" King's College Sociobiology Group, eds., Current Problems in Sociobiology, Cambridge, Cambridge University Press, pp. 45–64.
- Mayr, E. (1997) The objects of selection Proc. Natl. Acad. Sci. USA 94 (March): 2091-2094.
