= W. D. Hamilton =

British evolutionary biologist (1936–2000)

- Born: William Donald Hamilton; 1 August 1936; Cairo, Egypt
- Died: 7 March 2000 (aged 63); Fitzrovia, London, United Kingdom
- Education: St. John's College, Cambridge; London School of Economics; University College London
- Known for: Kin selection, Hamilton's rule, Green-beard effect
- Spouse: Christine Friess
- Children: Three daughters
- Parent(s): Archibald Milne Hamilton and Bettina Matraves Hamilton née Collier
- Awards: Newcomb Cleveland Prize (1981); Linnean Medal (1989); Kyoto Prize (1993); Crafoord Prize (1993); Sewall Wright Award (1998)
- Scientific career
- Fields: Evolutionary biology
- Workplaces: Imperial College London, University of Michigan, University of Oxford
- Academic advisors: John Hajnal; Cedric Smith
- Doctoral students: Laurence Hurst; Olivia Judson

William Donald Hamilton (1 August 1936 – 7 March 2000) was a British evolutionary biologist, recognised as one of the most significant evolutionary theorists of the 20th century. Hamilton became known for his theoretical work expounding a rigorous genetic basis for the existence of altruism, an insight that was a key part of the development of the gene-centered view of evolution. He is considered one of the forerunners of sociobiology. Hamilton published important work on sex ratios and the evolution of sex. From 1984 to his death in 2000, he was a Royal Society Research Professor at Oxford University.

Richard Dawkins has written that Hamilton was "the greatest Darwinian of my lifetime".

== Early life ==
Hamilton was born in 1936 in Cairo, Egypt, the second of seven children. His parents were from New Zealand; his father A.M. Hamilton was an engineer, and his mother Bettina Matraves Hamilton (nee Collier) was a physician. Two sisters qualified in medicine: Mary Bliss, who developed the alternating pressure mattress for the prevention of bedsores, and Janet who became a general practitioner. Another sister Margaret became a pasture scientist and brother an engineer.

The Hamilton family settled in Kent. During the Second World War, Hamilton was evacuated to Edinburgh. He became interested in natural history at an early age and spent his spare time collecting butterflies and other insects. In 1946, he discovered E.B. Ford's New Naturalist book Butterflies, which introduced him to the principles of evolution by natural selection, genetics, and population genetics.

He was educated at Tonbridge School, where he was in Smythe House. As a 12-year-old, he was seriously injured while playing with explosives that his father had, which were left over from making hand grenades for the Home Guard during World War II. Hamilton had to have a thoracotomy and parts of fingers on his right hand amputated in King's College Hospital to save his life. He was left with scarring and needed six months to recover.

Before going to the University of Cambridge, he travelled in France and completed two years of national service. As an undergraduate at St. John's College in Biology, he was uninspired by the "many biologists [who] hardly seemed to believe in evolution".

== Hamilton's rule ==
Hamilton enrolled in an MSc course in demography at the London School of Economics (LSE), under Norman Carrier, who helped secure grants for his studies. Later, when his work became more mathematical and genetical, he had his supervision transferred to John Hajnal of the LSE and Cedric Smith of University College London (UCL).

Both Ronald Fisher and J. B. S. Haldane had seen a problem in how organisms could increase the fitness of their own genes by aiding their close relatives, but not recognised its significance or properly formulated it. Hamilton worked through several examples, and eventually realised that the number that kept falling out of his calculations was Sewall Wright's coefficient of relationship. This became Hamilton's rule: in each behaviour-evoking situation, the individual assesses his neighbour's fitness against his own according to the coefficients of relationship appropriate to the situation. Algebraically, the rule posits that a costly action should be performed if:

$C < r \times B$

where C is the cost in fitness to the actor, r the genetic relatedness between the actor and the recipient, and B is the fitness benefit to the recipient. Fitness costs and benefits are measured in fecundity. r is a number between 0 and 1. His two 1964 papers entitled The Genetical Evolution of Social Behaviour are now widely referenced.

The proof and discussion of its consequences, however, involved detailed mathematics, and two reviewers passed over the paper. The third, John Maynard Smith, did not completely understand it either, but recognised its significance. Having his work passed over later led to friction between Hamilton and Maynard Smith, as Hamilton thought Maynard Smith had held his work back to claim credit for the idea (during the review period Maynard Smith published a paper that referred briefly to similar ideas). The Hamilton paper was printed in the Journal of Theoretical Biology and, when first published, was largely ignored. Recognition of its significance gradually increased to the point that it is now routinely cited in biology books.

Much of the discussion relates to the evolution of eusociality in insects of the order Hymenoptera (ants, bees and wasps) based on their unusual haplodiploid sex-determination system. This system means that females are more closely related to their sisters than to their own (potential) offspring. Thus, Hamilton reasoned, a "costly action" would be better spent in helping to raise their sisters, rather than reproducing themselves.

The supergenes notion (sometimes called the Green-beard effect) - that organisms may evolve genes that are able to identify identical copies in others and preferentially direct social behaviours towards them - was theoretically clarified by Hamilton in 1987.

== Spiteful behaviour ==
In his 1970 paper Selfish and Spiteful Behaviour in an Evolutionary Model Hamilton considers the question of whether harm inflicted upon an organism must inevitably be a byproduct of adaptations for survival. What of possible cases where an organism is deliberately harming others without apparent benefit to the self? Such behaviour Hamilton calls spiteful. It can be explained as the increase in the chance of an organism's genetic alleles to be passed to the next generations by harming those that are less closely related than relationship by chance.

Spite, however, is unlikely ever to be elaborated into any complex forms of adaptation. Targets of aggression are likely to act in revenge, and the majority of pairs of individuals (assuming a panmictic species) exhibit a roughly average level of genetic relatedness, making the selection of targets of spite problematic.

== Extraordinary sex ratios ==
Between 1964 and 1977, Hamilton was a lecturer at Imperial College London (including Silwood Park, where a building is named in his honour). Whilst there he published a paper in Science on "extraordinary sex ratios". Fisher (1930) had proposed a model as to why "ordinary" sex ratios were nearly always 1:1 (but see Edwards 1998), and likewise extraordinary sex ratios, particularly in wasps, needed explanations. Hamilton had been introduced to the idea and formulated its solution in 1960 when he had been assigned to help Fisher's pupil A.W.F. Edwards test the Fisherian sex ratio hypothesis. Hamilton combined his extensive knowledge of natural history with deep insight into the problem, opening up a whole new area of research.

The paper introduced the concept of the "unbeatable strategy", which John Maynard Smith and George R. Price were to develop into the evolutionarily stable strategy (ESS), a concept in game theory not limited to evolutionary biology. Price had originally come to Hamilton after deriving the Price equation, and thus rederiving Hamilton's rule. Maynard Smith later peer reviewed one of Price's papers, and drew inspiration from it. The paper was not published but Maynard Smith offered to make Price a co-author of his ESS paper, which helped to improve relations between the men. Price died in 1975, and Hamilton and Maynard Smith were among the few present at the funeral.

Hamilton was a visiting professor at Harvard University and later spent nine months with the Royal Society's and the Royal Geographical Society's Xavantina-Cachimbo Expedition as a visiting professor at the University of São Paulo. From 1978 Hamilton was Professor of Evolutionary Biology at the University of Michigan. Simultaneously, he was elected a Foreign Honorary Member of American Academy of Arts and Sciences. His arrival sparked protests and sit-ins from students who did not like his association with sociobiology. There he worked with the political scientist Robert Axelrod on the prisoner's dilemma, and was a member of the BACH group with original members Arthur Burks, Robert Axelrod, Michael Cohen, and John Holland.

Hamilton was regarded as a poor lecturer. This shortcoming would not affect the recognition of his work, however, as it was popularised by Richard Dawkins in the book The Selfish Gene published in 1976.

== Chasing the Red Queen ==
Hamilton was an early proponent of the Red Queen theory of the evolution of sex (separate from the other theory of the same name previously proposed by Leigh Van Valen). This was named for a character in Lewis Carroll's Through the Looking-Glass, who is continuously running but never actually travels any distance:

"Well, in our country," said Alice, still panting a little, "you'd generally get to somewhere else—if you ran very fast for a long time, as we've been doing."
"A slow sort of country!" said the Queen. "Now, here, you see, it takes all the running you can do, to keep in the same place. If you want to get somewhere else, you must run at least twice as fast as that!" (Carroll, pp. 46)

This theory hypothesizes that sex evolved because new and unfamiliar combinations of genes could be presented to parasites, preventing the parasite from preying on that organism: species with sex were able to continuously "run away" from their parasites. Likewise, parasites were able to evolve mechanisms to get around the organism's new set of genes, thus perpetuating an endless race.

== Return to Britain ==
In 1980, he was elected a Fellow of the Royal Society, and in 1984, he was invited by Richard Southwood to be the Royal Society Research Professor in the Department of Zoology at Oxford, and a fellow of New College, where he remained until his death.

His collected papers, entitled Narrow Roads of Gene Land, began to be published in 1996. The first volume was entitled Evolution of Social Behaviour.

In 1998, Hamilton co-authored the paper "Spora and Gaia" with Tim Lenton, proposing that marine algae's tendency to release dimethyl sulfide, which in turn acts as a chemical precursor for cloud condensation nuclei, is an adaptive trait, as the algae can use the clouds to disperse themselves around the world.

== Social evolution ==
The field of social evolution, of which Hamilton's Rule has central importance, is broadly defined as being the study of the evolution of social behaviours, i.e. those that impact on the fitness of individuals other than the actor. Social behaviours can be categorized according to the fitness consequences they entail for the actor and recipient. A behaviour that increases the direct fitness of the actor is mutually beneficial if the recipient also benefits, and selfish if the recipient suffers a loss. A behaviour that reduces the fitness of the actor is altruistic if the recipient benefits, and spiteful if the recipient suffers a loss. This classification was first proposed by Hamilton in 1964.

Hamilton also proposed the coevolution theory of autumn leaf color as an example of evolutionary signalling theory.

== Origin of HIV ==
During the 1990s, Hamilton became interested in the now-discredited hypothesis that the origin of HIV lay in Hilary Koprowski's oral polio vaccine trials in Africa during the 1950s. Hamilton's letter on the topic to Science journal was rejected in 1996. Despite this, he spoke to the BBC supporting the hypothesis, and wrote the foreword of Edward Hooper's 1999 book The River. To look for evidence of the hypothesis, Hamilton went on a 2000 field trip to the Democratic Republic of the Congo to assess natural levels of simian immunodeficiency virus in primates.

== Death ==
Hamilton returned to London from Africa on 29 January 2000. He was admitted to University College Hospital, London, on 30 January 2000. He was transferred to Middlesex Hospital on 5 February 2000 and died there on 7 March 2000. An inquest was held on 10 May 2000 at Westminster Coroner's Court to inquire into rumours about the cause of his death. The coroner concluded that his death was due to "multi-organ failure due to upper gastrointestinal haemorrhage due to a duodenal diverticulum and arterial bleed through a mucosal ulcer". Following reports attributing his death to complications arising from malaria, the BBC Editorial Complaints Unit's investigation established that he had contracted malaria during his final African expedition. However, the pathologist had suggested the possibility that the ulceration and consequent haemorrhage had resulted from a pill (which might have been taken because of malarial symptoms) lodging in the diverticulum; but, even if this suggestion were correct, the link between malaria and the observed causes of death would be entirely indirect.

A secular memorial service (he was an agnostic) was held at the chapel of New College, Oxford on 1 July 2000, organised by Richard Dawkins. He was buried near Wytham Woods. He, however, had written an essay on My intended burial and why in which he wrote:

I will leave a sum in my last will for my body to be carried to Brazil and to these forests. It will be laid out in a manner secure against the possums and the vultures just as we make our chickens secure; and this great Coprophanaeus beetle will bury me. They will enter, will bury, will live on my flesh; and in the shape of their children and mine, I will escape death. No worm for me nor sordid fly, I will buzz in the dusk like a huge bumble bee. I will be many, buzz even as a swarm of motorbikes, be borne, body by flying body out into the Brazilian wilderness beneath the stars, lofted under those beautiful and un-fused elytra which we will all hold over our backs. So finally I too will shine like a violet ground beetle under a stone.

The second volume of his collected papers, Evolution of Sex, was published in 2002, and the third and final volume, Last Words, in 2005.

In 1966, he married Christine Friess; the couple had three daughters, Helen, Ruth, and Rowena. They separated amicably 26 years later. From 1994, Hamilton found companionship with Maria Luisa Bozzi, an Italian science journalist and author.

== Awards ==
- 1978 Foreign Honorary Member of American Academy of Arts and Sciences
- 1980 Fellow of the Royal Society of London
- 1982 Newcomb Cleveland Prize of the American Association for the Advancement of Science
- 1988 Darwin Medal of the Royal Society of London
- 1989 Scientific Medal of the Linnean Society
- 1991 Frink Medal of Zoological Society of London
- 1992/3 Wander Prize of the University of Bern
- 1993 Crafoord Prize of the Royal Swedish Academy of Sciences
- 1993 Kyoto Prize of the Inamori Foundation
- 1995 Fyssen Prize of the Fyssen Foundation
- 1997 Honorary title of Academician of Science in Finland
- 1999 Member of the American Philosophical Society

== Biographies ==
- Alan Grafen has written a biographical memoir for the Royal Society.
- A biographical book has also been published by Ullica Segerstråle : Segerstråle, U. 2013. Nature's oracle: the life and work of W. D. Hamilton. Oxford University Press. ISBN 978-0-19-860728-1

== Works ==
=== Collected papers ===
Hamilton started to publish his collected papers in 1996, along the lines of Fisher's collected papers, with short essays giving each paper context. He died after the preparation of the second volume, so the essays for the third volume come from his coauthors.

- Hamilton W.D. (1996) Narrow Roads of Gene Land vol. 1: Evolution of Social Behaviour Oxford University Press, Oxford. ISBN 978-0-7167-4530-3
- Hamilton W.D. (2002) Narrow Roads of Gene Land vol. 2: Evolution of Sex Oxford University Press, Oxford. ISBN 978-0-19-850336-1
- Hamilton W.D. (2005) Narrow Roads of Gene Land, vol. 3: Last Words (with essays by coauthors, ed. M. Ridley). Oxford University Press, Oxford. ISBN 978-0-19-856690-8

=== Significant papers ===
- Hamilton, W. (1964). "The genetical evolution of social behaviour. I". Journal of Theoretical Biology. 7 (1): 1–16. Bibcode:1964JThBi...7....1H. doi:10.1016/0022-5193(64)90038-4. PMID 5875341.
- Hamilton, W. (1964). "The genetical evolution of social behaviour. II". Journal of Theoretical Biology. 7 (1): 17–52. Bibcode:1964JThBi...7...17H. doi:10.1016/0022-5193(64)90039-6. PMID 5875340.
- Hamilton, W. (1966). "The moulding of senescence by natural selection". Journal of Theoretical Biology. 12 (1): 12–45. Bibcode:1966JThBi..12...12H. doi:10.1016/0022-5193(66)90184-6. PMID 6015424.
- Hamilton, W. (1967). "Extraordinary sex ratios. A sex-ratio theory for sex linkage and inbreeding has new implications in cytogenetics and entomology". Science. 156 (774): 477–488. Bibcode:1967Sci...156..477H. doi:10.1126/science.156.3774.477. PMID 6021675.
- Hamilton, W. (1971). "Geometry for the selfish herd". Journal of Theoretical Biology. 31 (2): 295–311. Bibcode:1971JThBi..31..295H. doi:10.1016/0022-5193(71)90189-5. PMID 5104951.
- Hamilton W. D. (1975). Innate social aptitudes of man: an approach from evolutionary genetics. in R. Fox (ed.), Biosocial Anthropology, Malaby Press, London, 133–53.
- Axelrod, R.; Hamilton, W. (1981). "The evolution of cooperation". Science. 211 (4489): 1390–1396. Bibcode:1981Sci...211.1390A. doi:10.1126/science.7466396. PMID 7466396. with Robert Axelrod
- Hamilton, W.; Zuk, M. (1982). "Heritable true fitness and bright birds: A role for parasites?". Science. 218 (4570): 384–387. Bibcode:1982Sci...218..384H. doi:10.1126/science.7123238. PMID 7123238. S2CID 17658568.
- Hamilton, W.D.; Lenton, T.M. (1998). "Spora and Gaia: how microbes fly with their clouds". Ethology Ecology & Evolution. 10 (1): 1–16. Bibcode:1998EtEcE..10....1H. doi:10.1080/08927014.1998.9522867. Archived from the original (PDF) on 23 July 2011.
