= Tilloclytus conradti =

Scientific classification
- Kingdom: Animalia
- Phylum: Arthropoda
- Clade: Pancrustacea
- Class: Insecta
- Order: Coleoptera
- Suborder: Polyphaga
- Infraorder: Cucujiformia
- Family: Cerambycidae
- Genus: Tilloclytus
- Species: T. conradti

Binomial name
- Tilloclytus conradti Bates, 1892

Species of beetle

Tilloclytus conradti is a species of longhorn beetle in the Cerambycinae subfamily. It was described by English entomologist Henry Walter Bates in 1892, based on biological specimens collected during late 19th-century scientific expeditions.

== Taxonomy ==
The species was first introduced to scientific literature in the Transactions of the Entomological Society of London. Bates placed the species within the tribe Anaglyptini based on its distinct dental and antennal features. The specific epithet conradti honors Leopold Conradt, a prominent naturalist and collector who secured the type specimen from regional wilderness zones. Over successive generations, the classification has been maintained within the genus Tilloclytus across global longhorn catalogs without undergoing significant major synonymic restructuring.

== Description ==
In common with other members of the tribe Anaglyptini, Tilloclytus conradti displays a slender, elongated body plan designed to mimic the appearance of ants, a defensive survival mechanism known as myrmecomorphy. The head is somewhat retracted with prominent, finely faceted compound eyes. Its antennae are elongated and threadlike, functioning as highly sensitive environmental sensory organs. The elytra are hard, protective forewings that cover the abdomen, featuring subtle textural patterns and microscopic hair-like structures or setae characteristic of central American cerambycids.

== Distribution and habitat ==
The documented geographic distribution of Tilloclytus conradti is restricted to the tropical forest environments of Guatemala. The primary type specimens were documented in specific sub-montane forest zones where dense vegetation provides optimal foraging and breeding conditions. Larvae are typically wood-boring insects that develop within dead or dying timber branches, playing a vital role in local nutrient cycling by accelerating the decomposition of organic matter in Neotropical ecosystems.
