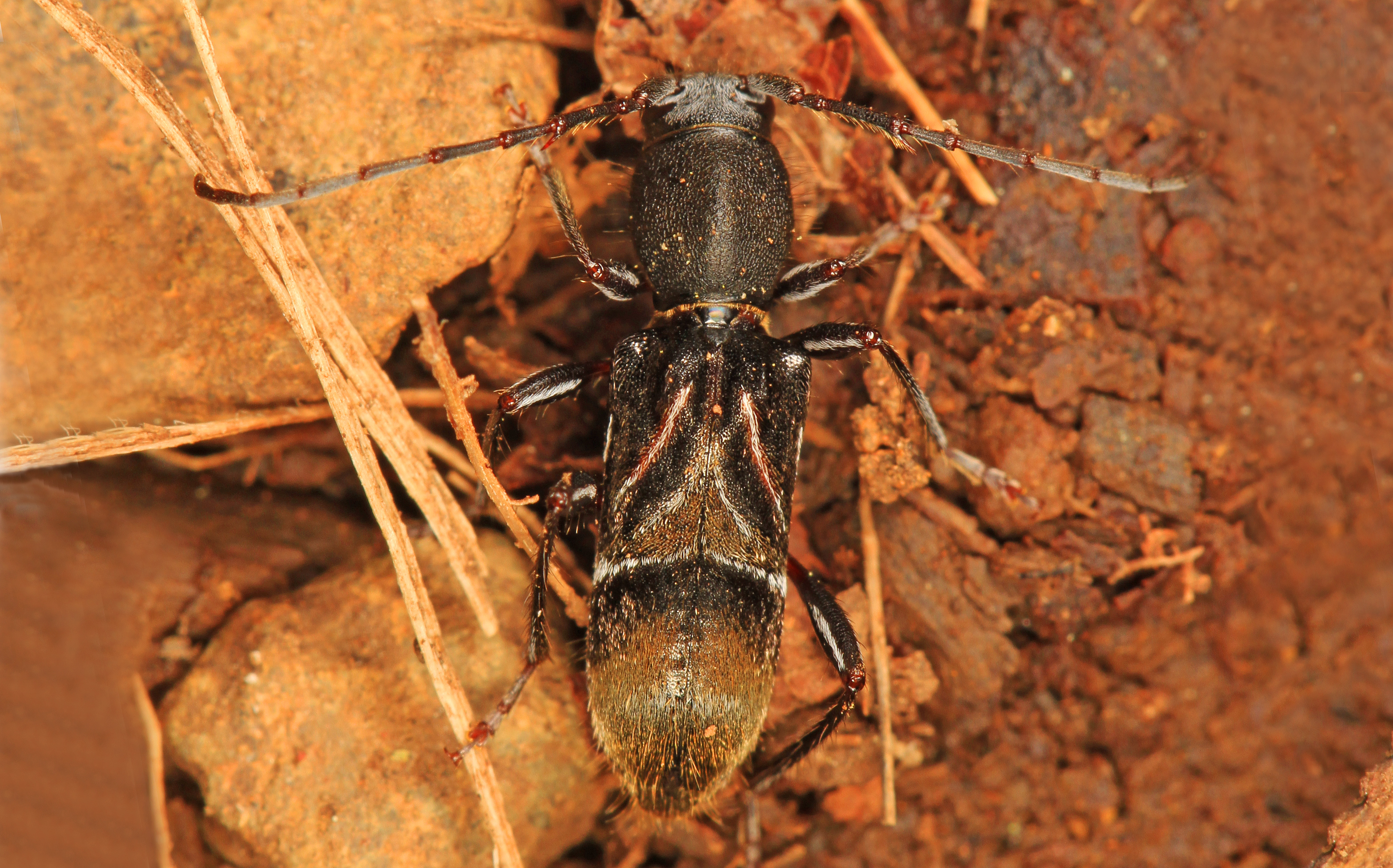
- Adult photographed at the G. R. Thompson Wildlife Management Area in Linden, Virginia

Scientific classification
- Kingdom: Animalia
- Phylum: Arthropoda
- Clade: Pancrustacea
- Class: Insecta
- Order: Coleoptera
- Suborder: Polyphaga
- Infraorder: Cucujiformia
- Family: Cerambycidae
- Genus: Cyrtophorus
- Species: C. verrucosus

Binomial name
- Cyrtophorus verrucosus (Olivier, 1795)

= Cyrtophorus verrucosus =

Species of beetle

Cyrtophorus verrucosus, commonly known as the ant-like longhorn beetle or ant-mimic longhorn beetle, is a species of beetle in the family Cerambycidae. It is native to North America, more specifically southern Canada and the eastern United States.

== Description ==
C. verrucosus is a specialized ant mimic, even moving in a manner similar to an ant. It has varying amounts of red and black in two forms (the red thought to be mimicking Camponotus chromaiodes and the black Camponotus pennsylvanicus). The pronotum has knobs at its base, two white lines of setae near the center. It is usually between 7 mm (0.28 in) and 11 mm (0.43 in) in length.

== Behavior and life cycle ==
This species inhabits deciduous forests and is sometimes found on spring flowers, from which adult beetles extract pollen and nectar. Larvae develop in and feed on hardwood trees, most commonly in the genera Acer, Betula, Cercis, Pinus, and Ulmus. Adult beetles are usually active between March and July.

== Geographic range ==
It is widely believed that due to biodiversity loss, there has been a decrease of C. verruscosus in the Ontario region. In the last 100 years, over 18,000 specimens have been collected, and the accumulation curve shows that the loss of forested habitat is likely the cause. C. verrucosus typically inhabit a broad geographic range, with specific numbers depending on factors such as habitat suitability and the availability of deciduous forestry. Most C. verrucosus depend heavily on tree or shrub hosts for their growth and development.

As a result, it follows that host availability and particular changes in the distribution of host abundance can change the geographic range of C. verrucosus. The most common host plants include Southern hardwoods, such as hackberry and hickory, along with white pine on sandy soil types. Data shows a 10% decline in the number of C. verrucosus in the Ontario region, and research discussions have come across environmental change as the primary driver of species loss in the region. Previously, C. verrucosus were known to inhabit the Carolinian Forest region, the Great Lakes-St Lawrence region, and limited areas along the north shore of Lake Ontario, Lake Huron, and the Niagara Peninsula. The waning geographic range comes from farmers clearing lands for towns and cities as well as timber extraction to remove forest cover. Ultimately, understanding the range of C. verrucosus requires phenology work and there has been a lack of interest for research institutions in Ontario.

== Habitat ==
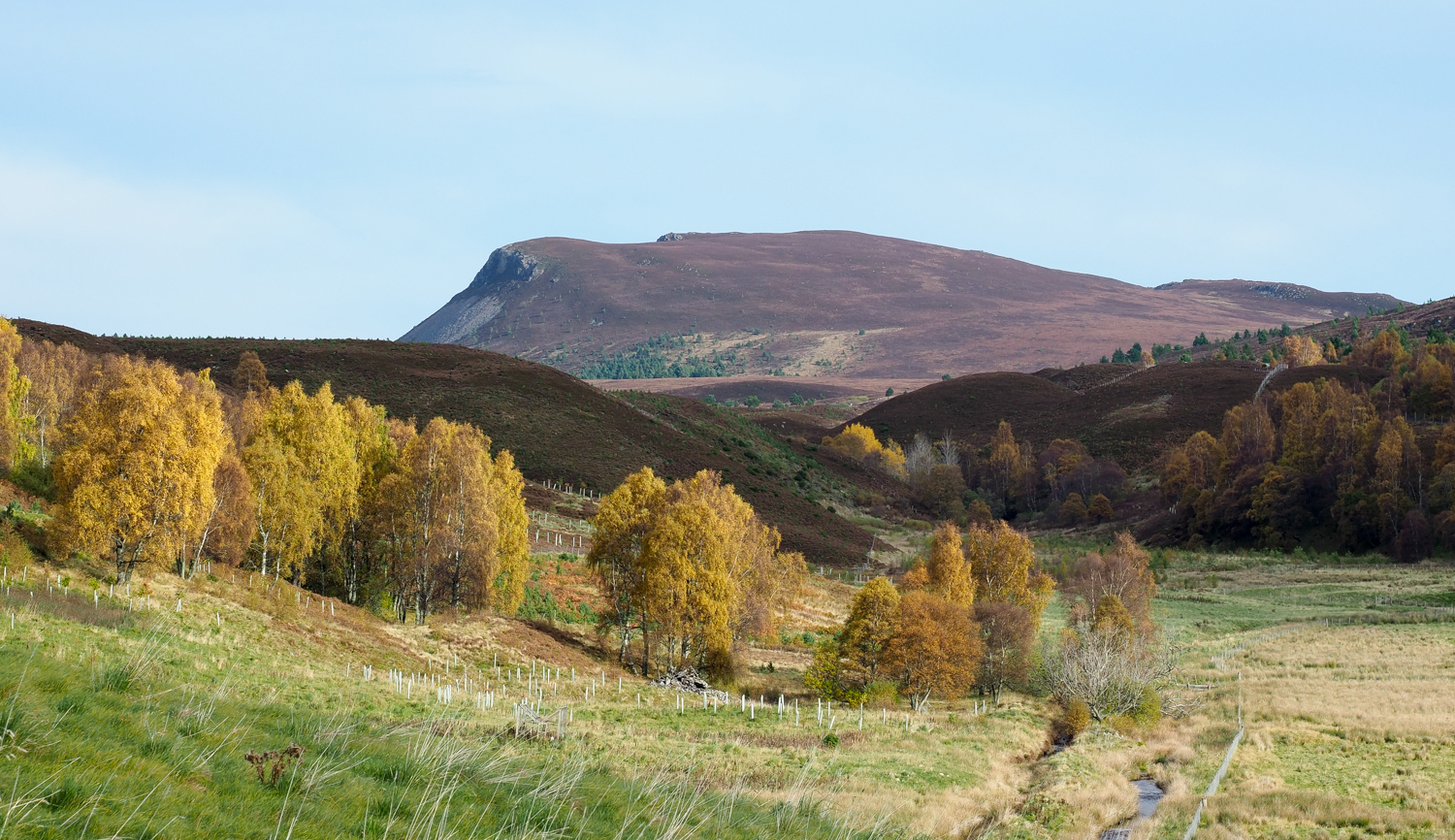
Deciduous trees, key habitats for C. verrucosus beetles, contribute to urban forest ecosystems by hosting these beetles, which aid in nutrient cycling and ecosystem turnover

C. verrucosus beetles have been designated as the most abundant species of beetle in a collection of urban forest fragments in Northern Delaware. Much is known about C. verrucosus inhabiting abundant and diverse rainforests, but researchers have recently determined that C. verrucosus inhabit forest trees as pests. Their relationship with their habitat is fueled by their ecological roles as decomposers. As such, they contribute to the nutrient cycling that maintains ecosystem turnover, which has led researchers to better understand biodiversity and the varying ecological needs of C. verrucosus habitats in North America.

In one such case study, it was found that C. verrucosus have seasonal phenology, in which they abandoned temporal isolation from their habitat to pursue reproductive interests. Flight periods of C. verrucosus were analyzed and pheromone blends were instituted to track movements away from temperate forest environments. To measure species richness and adult phenology of C. verrucosus, ethanol solutions are mixed with plant volatile from stressed trees. This creates the necessary pheromone blend for an ethanol-synergized pheromone trap to catch C. verrucosus and measure their count in specific habitat regions. Ethanol emissions increase from trees after particularly stressful events and beetles like C. verrucosus use ethanol to locate these stressed trees to make them hosts. This can occur even in the absence of pheromone signals. In the previously mentioned study, it was found that pheromones from different colonies of C. verrucosus are being collected to create a database to improve future blends and possibly create one central blend to produce a multi-species attractant. This could enable researchers to study a larger subset of beetle taxa within diverse forest habitats whether they are temperate/deciduous forests or more boreal forests characterized by pines and larches.

== Home range and territoriality ==
In terms of home range and territoriality, larval host plant and distributional records have offered several important pieces of biological information regarding how C. verrucosus disperse within their ecosystems. Larvae from C. verrucosus were collected in the dead portions of living trees/shrubs. Additionally, larvae from the polyphagous C. verrucosus were collected from dead stems that retained moisture due to heavy soil contact. It was found that C. verrucosus tend to inhabit a small home range in which they maintain proximity to their initial site of infestation. Researchers found that C. verrucosus larvae will often go down into the roots of plants like Shepherdia canadensis and reside in the transition zone between living and rotting tissues.

In collected samples of Vaccinium corymbosum, C. verrucosus was also found to stay located close to the lower portions of thick, dead stems. The final two plant species analyzed by researchers were Hamamelis virginiana and Celtis occidentalis. It was found that C. verrucosus beetles tended to live within the dead scar tissue in these plants following damage incurred by deer. In terms of territoriality, very little is currently known about Cyrtophorus beetles. No evidence regarding direct territoriality has been found. Many influences likely factor into home range and territorial behaviors including habitat structure, the availability of suitable breeding sites, ecological damage, population density, intraspecies competition, interspecies competition, and resource availability. In intensely competitive environments, C. verrucosus beetles likely need to compete with other pest-like beetles over the pollen and nectar of host-plant sites. Yet, several aspects of C. verrucosus ecology have yet to be studied including communication patterns, foraging behaviors, and resource defense. Each of these parameters certainly contributes to territoriality and may provide helpful links between intraspecies dynamics and the way C. verrucosus beetles distinctly establish a home range from other pollen-seeking beetle species.

== Food resources ==
A vital component of the overall life cycle and sociality of C. verrucosus beetles is their food habits and access to ecologically stable food resources. It has been discovered that C. verrucosus live in the woods of wild red cherry trees, quince trees, and various temperate forest trees like hickory. Ultimately, the food resources that C. verrucosus consume are heavily impacted by their geographical distribution and mimicry of ant species. C. verrucosus maintains a highly extended range, from deciduous forests in Canada down to the tropical regions of Mexico and the West Indies.

They mainly extract the pollen and nectar of host plant species by utilizing their morphological similarities to ants. From their similar color patterns to physiological adaptations, C. verrucosus beetles find their way into hardwood plants and spring-flowering trees. The particular mechanism by which C. verrucosus beetles socialize and engage in cooperative foraging is unknown. While some semblance of social behavior has been discovered, it is unknown whether such mechanisms apply to the domain of pollen extraction and nectar procurement. Additionally, C. verrucosus using nectar and pollen extends beyond their immediate nutritional needs. In extracting pollen and nectar from deciduous forestry, these beetles act as pollinators for flowering plants, which increases the abundance and diversity of plant species in local ecosystems. This works to shape the biodiversity of habitats and ultimately builds overall resilience within ecosystems. C. verrucosus use of nectar and pollen is essential for maintaining the greater health and integrity of plant-animal interactions.

They also improve habitat connectivity by facilitating the dispersal of plant species and helping to colonize fragmented landscapes by ensuring a sense of redundancy in pollination interactions.

== Social behavior ==
Using the pheromone components (R)-3-hydroxyhexan-2-one and alkan-2-one, mechanisms of underlying social behavior in C. verrucosus have been discovered.

Pheromone chemistry has provided researchers with the ability to track and relate even distantly related populations of beetle species. Researchers found that C. verrucosus beetles exhibit a sociality related to nonan-2-one pheromone signaling. This signaling is important for foraging behaviors, mating rituals, reproductive success, resource competition, etc. The addition of nonan-2-one enhanced the chemical signal of the 3R-ketone blend and the most attractive ratios were the blends collected via the aeration of adult males. Thus, it is proposed that sociality among C. verrucosus beetles is not only highly dependent on pheromone signals but particularly on the presence of both 3R-ketone and nonan-2-one. When each was presented in isolation in a mate location, they presented insignificant and non-critical levels of attraction. Consequently, the nonan-2-one pheromone signal may be acting as a deterrent for other C. verrucosus beetles. In two sympatric species, A. pumilus and P. aereus, there was no attraction to the presence of nonan-2-one. Future research will need to be conducted to better highlight how pheromone signaling informs the social behaviors of C. verrucosus with other species of cerambycid beetles. While there are foundational underpinnings for the nature in which pheromone signaling is used by C. verrucosus in social meetings, there is much to uncover surrounding how pheromones regulate social organization, social hierarchies, and intra-colony division of labor.

Furthermore, researchers are aware that pheromones such as nonan-2-one are highly important for oviposition sites and guiding beetles towards sources of pollen and nectar, but it is unclear how these pheromone signals bias interactions with other C. verrucosus beetles. Conspecifics can exhaust reserves for nectar and pollen located in deciduous forestry, so it's plausible that pheromones influence social behaviors about cooperative sharing and resource allocation.

== Genetics ==
From a genetic standpoint, C. verrucosus beetles utilize volatile sex and aggregation-sex pheromones as a form of communication with closely related individuals. It has been discovered that there is an intrinsic genetic component to their seasonal phenology, most particularly as it pertains to circadian rhythm flight periods in adult Cyrtophorus verrucosus beetles. In a variety of collected bioassays, researchers have found evidence of pheromones like (R)-3-hydroxyhexan-2-one as a dominant pheromone component that serves as an evolutionary advantage surrounding the locating of possible mates.

The genetic underpinnings of C. verrucosus have contributed to a sort of genetic plasticity in which volatile pheromones are used to advertise males to available and plausibly receptive mates. Even over longer distances, the pheromone chemistry has been implicated in bringing C. verrucosus sexes together to facilitate mating. Yet, the exact genetic sequencing necessary to provide steadfast evidence of such pathways has not been conducted in sufficient populations of C. verrucosus beetles. In another study, researchers began asking questions about the genetic backbone that contributes to trap surface treatments on C. verrucosus beetles. In observing trap captures of C. verrucosus when increasing the use of a lubricant (such as fluon), increased expression of genes that encode cell-membrane binding proteins to enable cell signaling was found. While the particular biochemical mechanism is still unknown, this lipid-binding protein helps protect C. verrucosus from the detrimental effects of pheromone signaling.

Thus, work has begun surrounding the various genetic components of pheromone signaling in beetle species such as C. verrucosus. Using assays previously tested on rodent populations, researchers hope to better understand pheromone production, signaling, and response efforts. This would give way to an increased understanding of the social interactions and reproductive tendencies of C. verrucosus that have maintained a consistently under-studied sociality.

== Mating ==
Recent work in the chemical communication (via pheromones) and molecular roots of olfactory sensation in C. verrucosus beetles has uncovered much about their previously unstudied mating behaviors. It has been found that males in cerambycid beetle taxa of the larger subfamily Cerambycinae produce identical pheromones in a process that can lead to cross-attraction amongst closely related species of beetle. The mating systems in which males attract females via olfaction generally underlie reproductive behaviors. The facilitation of mating rituals via dominant pheromones is a novel finding of the research of C. verrucosus beetles as it implies that remarkably simple, yet conserved, chemicals can produce an undiscovered attraction between different species of beetles.

It was thought that C. verrucosus maintained mating behaviors within their subgroups or colonies on plants and trees where nectar and pollen extraction was viable. Now, pheromone signaling plays an even more vital role in plausible mating strategies as it shows the possibility of promiscuity amongst populations of C. verrucosus. Furthermore, beyond superficial modalities of attraction, pheromone signaling affects mating behaviors in the larger domain of both mate recognition and reproductive isolation. Concerning mate recognition, pheromones provide chemical signals to viable mating partners and help C. verrucosus create a distinction between mating partners and non-mating partners. This both ensures reproductive success and contributes to intraspecies genetic diversity. Reproductive isolation provides another intriguing avenue by which populations of C. verrucosus may purposely isolate themselves from other populations of C. verrucosus or other closely related taxa as a means of preserving desired pheromone composition. While very little work has been conducted in the subfield of speciation as it pertains to C. verrucosus, reproductive isolation certainly presents questions surrounding the possibility of C. verrucosus evolving alongside closely related mimicking beetle species to form novel species over evolutionary time.

== Physiology ==
C. verrucosus beetles are a species of ant-mimicking beetles. As such they have developed physiological specifications about their biology and morphology. One particular electrophoretic study uncovered that they contain both red and black morphs, thus, not only does C. verrucosus display mimicry, but they are also polymorphic. While the black morphs predominate in the northern United States, the red morphs—which tend to be smaller—are more commonly found in the southern United States. Populations of C. verrucosus beetles were analyzed alongside Euderces reichei and Eutrichillus pini beetles to estimate typical interspecific levels of physiological and morph differentiation. It was found that populations of C. verrucosus show a fixed difference and consistent patterns of clear association between both morph and electrophoretic genotype. This suggests that red and black morphs could be more than just a genetic polymorphism. Possibilities for their genetic development include as an adaptive advantage to improve the extraction of nectar and pollen. However, regarding physiologies, researchers have recently uncovered that black and red morphologies are not genetically discrete entities. They are also not parapatrically distributed species that are arranged into a hybrid species, as electrophoretic data refutes such sentiments.

In another study, researchers used the underlying physiological properties surrounding pheromone signaling. By using a commonly known technique of changing trap heights and bait types, the abundance and species diversity of C. verrucosus beetles were analyzed. Pheromones present intriguing insight into the basic physiological properties of C. verrucosus. Most importantly, pheromone signaling has been implicated in complex processes such as stress response and development physiology. Through rapid signaling early in life, the neural circuits of C. verrucosus maintain a plasticity that not only influences their social behavioral tendencies but also their reproductive abilities and related mating systems.

== Mutualism ==
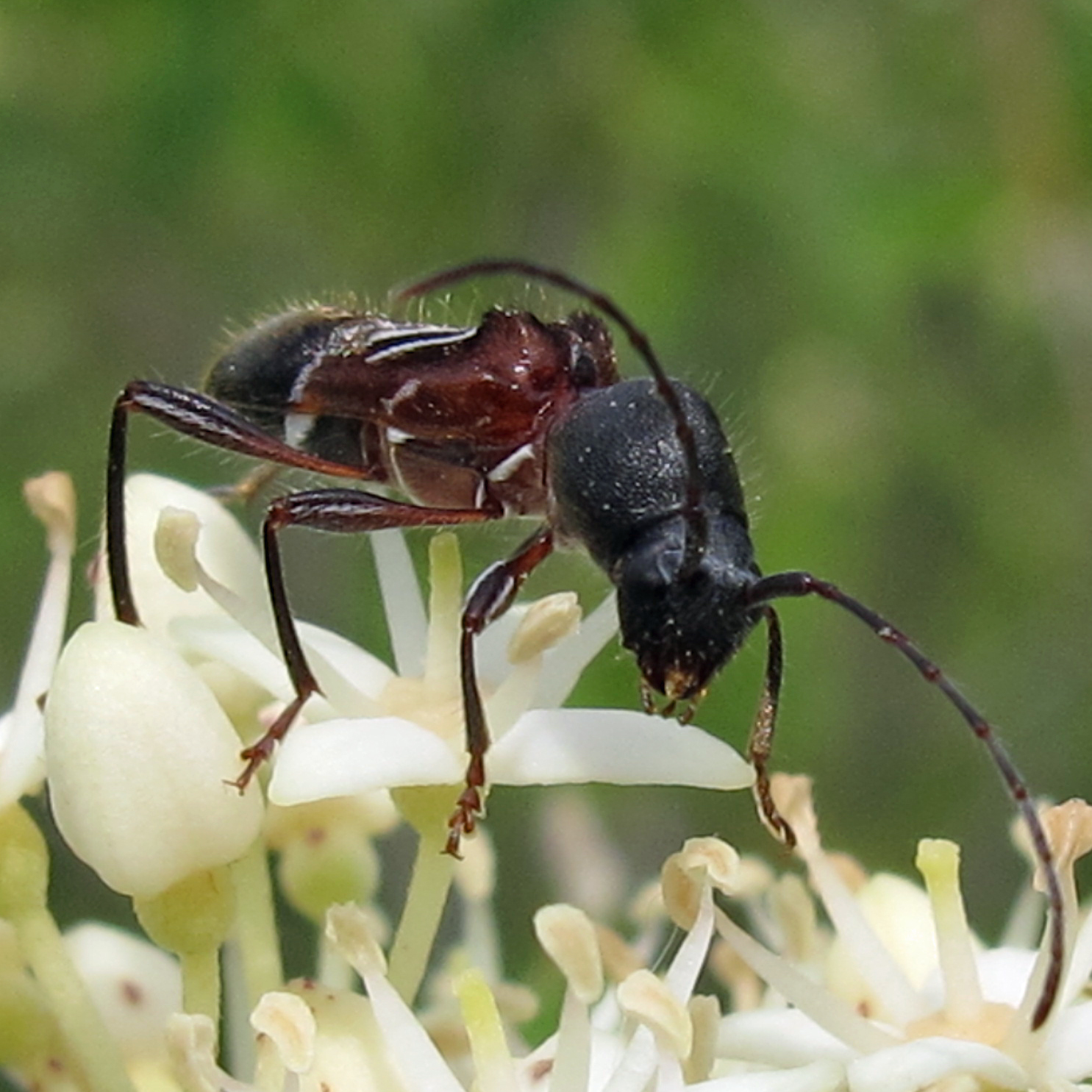
C. verrucosus beetle on a flower, showcasing its mutualistic role in pollination and nectar extraction, vital for the reproductive success of host plants in deciduous forests

With regards to mutualism, C. verrucosus has been implicated in a complex relationship with several plant and tree species for pollen and nectar extraction. Using palynology, the identification of floral hosts for C. verrucosus and other related Cerambycid species has been made possible. It is known that pollen and nectar are vital food sources for adult beetles since their larvae are forest pests. A system of mutualism reliant on palynivory was found in C. verrucosus. From this, new floral host associations were described including Platanus occidentalis, Juglans nigra, and Fraximus. Researchers have also discovered that there is a high relative diversity of pollen grains from the analyzed frass, which suggests that beetles like C. verrucosus visit a multitude of flower species during their lives.

The mutualism between C. verrucosus and related floral hosts mainly involves nectar provisioning. As a return for extracting pollen from particular floral hosts and spreading such pollen to nearby plant species to facilitate cross-pollination—and ultimately improve the reproductive success of the host—the floral host provides the beetle with nectar. Nectar provides the beetle with a sugary energy source.

Mutualism between floral hosts and C. verrucosus beetles involves certain co-evolutionary dynamics. Despite C. verrucosus beetles pollinating multiple plant species over their lifetime, they may also develop specific traits that aid and enhance their mutualistic relationship with floral hosts. From morphological changes like making their red or black morphs more distinct or modulating their pheromone signaling to decrease pollination competition with related beetles, C. verrucosus will develop particular traits to improve their access to nectar and pollen. This specialization between specific beetle populations and particular floral hosts contributes to a highly advanced system of mutualism in deciduous forest habitats across North America.

== Microbiome interactions ==
Cyrtophorus verrucosus maintains intricate interactions with various microorganisms, collectively forming its microbiome. These microbial communities play essential roles in the beetle's digestion, immunity, and overall health.

Studies have revealed the presence of diverse microbial communities in the gut of Cyrtophorus verrucosus. These gut microbiota contribute to the digestion of complex polysaccharides present in the beetle's diet, enhancing nutrient absorption and metabolic efficiency.

Beyond the gut, Cyrtophorus verrucosus harbors specialized bacteria in other niches on its body. These bacteria may play roles in detoxification, antimicrobial defense, or even communication with conspecifics.

The microbiome of Cyrtophorus verrucosus contributes to its overall fitness and ecological interactions. For example, certain gut microbes may confer resistance to pathogens or facilitate the breakdown of plant compounds, thus influencing the beetle's interactions with its environment.

The composition and diversity of the microbiome in Cyrtophorus verrucosus may vary based on factors such as diet, environmental conditions, and host genetics. Understanding the dynamics of these microbial communities could provide insights into the beetle's adaptation to changing ecological pressures.

== Conservation ==
C. verrucosus beetles can be used as relatively reliable markers for the habitat quality of the ecosystems they inhabit. By analyzing the sensitivity of C. verrucosus beetle and related Cerambycid beetle species biodiversity, researchers have been able to use C. verrucosus as indicators of the overall biological diversity of studied sites. The indicator values for these studied species (C. verrucosus included) were all statistically significant within an upper level of site typology. C. verrucosus especially showed strong correlations with the facilitations of the environment. C. verrucosus are excellent indicators of the health of their belonging communities since they are both easy to identify with their colorful morphs and because of their habitat specificity. From woodland habitats to deciduous forestry, C. verrucosus have rather particular and narrow larval host requirements, which emerge as indicators of lower levels of site typology.

On a simpler level, the general abundance of C. verrucosus beetles helps show the extent to which an ecosystem contains a diverse array of floral hosts alongside plentiful microhabitats. Furthermore, C. verrucosus beetles are incredibly sensitive to environmental changes, specifically habitat fragmentation and/or loss. When conditions of the environment such as microclimates and the condition of floral hosts begin to change or falter, levels of C. verrucosus are expected to change rather dramatically. Finally, as shown in the aforementioned study, C. verrucosus beetles are quite easy to sample via traps and certain baits, which gives researchers significant leverage in understanding population dynamics and abundance. Thus, the ecological roles of C. verrucosus can be studied short term and throughout longitudinal experiments. Yet, significant experimentation on how C. verrucosus beetles respond to environmental disturbances must be studied. Little work has been done in highlighting their mechanisms of mobilization and defense when it comes to rapid environmental degradation, whether anthropogenic or natural.

== Interactions with humans and livestock ==
The invasive C. verrucosus, a byproduct of international commerce, acts as ecological decomposers and pests of woody plants. The cerambycid beetles possess sex pheromones that stimulate aggregation behaviors. Researchers discovered that these pheromones can be combined from multiple different species to create a new mechanism for studying multiple species at the same time. A study created four blends consisting of 6-8 compounds including pheromones that came from C. verrucosus. Results revealed that many different cerambycid beetles were attracted to these mixtures. Thus, these concoctions can be used to lure multiple species at once for broader study. Further experimentation can refine these mixtures to optimize the concurring attraction of cerambycid beetles.
