= Lamia (poem) =

Poem by Keats

"Lamia" is a narrative poem written by the English poet John Keats, which first appeared in the volume Lamia, Isabella, the Eve of St Agnes and Other Poems, published in July 1820. The poem was written in 1819, during the famously productive period that produced his 1819 odes. It was composed soon after his "La Belle Dame sans Merci" and his odes on Melancholy, on Indolence, on a Grecian Urn and to a Nightingale, and just before "To Autumn".

== Plot ==
The poem tells how the god Hermes hears of a nymph who is more beautiful than all. Hermes, searching for the nymph, instead comes across Lamia, trapped in the form of a serpent. She reveals the previously invisible nymph to him and, in return, he restores her human form. She goes to seek a youth of Corinth, Lycius, while Hermes and his nymph depart together into the woods. The relationship between Lycius and Lamia, however, is destroyed when the sage Apollonius reveals Lamia's true identity at their wedding feast, whereupon she seemingly disappears and Lycius dies of grief.

== Analysis ==
According to Michael O'Neill, Lamia in the poem "is treated ambivalently but with considerable sympathy", making "a sharp contrast with the more leisurely and seemingly uncritical use of romance in [the] two narrative poems that follow ... the hapless Lycius is caught between the reductive rationalism of Apollonius and the bewitching illusoriness of Lamia."

== Influence ==
At the "immortal dinner party" held by Benjamin Haydon on 28 December 1817, Keats agreed with Charles Lamb that Newton "had destroyed all the poetry of the rainbow, by reducing it to the prismatic colours".

Keats's poem had a deep influence on Edgar Allan Poe's sonnet "To Science", specifically this passage's discussion of the baleful effects of "cold philosophy":

[...] Do not all charms fly
At the mere touch of cold philosophy?
There was an awful rainbow once in heaven:
We know her woof, her texture; she is given
In the dull catalogue of common things.
Philosophy will clip an Angel's wings,
Conquer all mysteries by rule and line,
Empty the haunted air, and gnomed mine—
Unweave a rainbow, as it erewhile made
The tender-person'd Lamia melt into a shade.

— Part II, lines 229–238

Poe's closing lines also echo several lines near the middle of "Lamia". The book Unweaving the Rainbow by Richard Dawkins takes its title from the above-quoted passage: it is an explicit attempt to demonstrate that this view of "cold philosophy" is incorrect and that science reveals, rather than destroys, the true beauty of the natural world. The poem also inspired symphonic poems by Edward MacDowell (1888) and Dorothy Howell (1918).

== Productions ==
The poem was dramatised on BBC Radio 4 on 1 January 2010 on the Afternoon Play series (later re-broadcast on 5 January 2012). The production was directed by Susan Roberts, with original music composed and performed by John Harle. The cast included:

- Paterson Joseph ...... Narrator
- Charlotte Emmerson ...... Lamia
- Tom Ferguson ...... Lycius
- Jonathan Keeble ...... Hermes/Apollonius
- Sarah Leonard ...... Singer
