= Climbing Mount Improbable =

Book by Richard Dawkins

- Cover of the British first edition
- Author: Richard Dawkins
- Illustrator: Lalla Ward
- Language: English
- Subject: Evolutionary biology
- Publisher: Norton
- Publication date: 1996
- Publication place: United Kingdom
- Media type: Print
- Pages: 340 pp.
- ISBN: 0-393-03930-7
- OCLC: 34633422
- Dewey Decimal: 575.01/62 20
- LC Class: QH375 .D376 1996
- Preceded by: River out of Eden
- Followed by: Unweaving the Rainbow

Climbing Mount Improbable is a 1996 popular science book by Richard Dawkins. The book’s central metaphor describes complex adaptations, which evolve gradually through a series of intermediates. This happens through the cumulative, nonrandom process of natural selection.

The book grew out of Dawkins’s Royal Institution Christmas Lectures, Growing Up in the Universe and shares its title with the third lecture. It was illustrated by Lalla Ward. Dawkins dedicated it to Robert Winston, “a good doctor and a good man.”

== Contents ==
1. Facing Mount Rushmore

Dawkins notes that some rocks resemble human faces. This is due to chance. Seeing Mount Rushmore in South Dakota, however, you’d know it was not due to chance, but design. Organisms appear to be designed. Various species display mimicry, some of it amazingly specific. Cyrtophorus verrucosus is a beetle that exhibits ant mimicry. It does so well enough to fool the inhabitants of the anthills where it lives. Coatonachthodes ovambolandicus is a termite that plays the same trick. Dawkins introduces the term designoid to describe objects in nature that have the appearance of being designed. Organisms are not due to chance. They were sculpted by the cumulative, nonrandom process that is the book's subject.

2. Silken Fetters

Dawkins describes the various webs woven by spiders. From the familiar web theme, spiders have woven striking variations, from the bolas spiders of South America to a New Guinea spider that weaves a ladder-like web to snare moths. Spiders that weave more effective webs will leave more descendants, so webs will get more effective as time goes by.

3. The Message From the Mountain

Dawkins introduces the book’s central metaphor. Borrowing from Sewall Wright’s concept of an adaptive landscape, it represents adaptations that are too complex to have evolved in one fell swoop. Fortunately, as Dawkins shows, there is a gradual path up Mount Improbable: the cumulative, nonrandom process of natural selection, which proceeds gradually through a series of intermediates.

The essential element is heredity, transmitted through DNA in all species on Earth. Advantageous changes, however rare, will be selected for, and accumulate. The wing and the eye are summits of Mount Improbable. He proceeds to climb each in turn.

4. Getting off the Ground

Dawkins describes the evolution of flight. It seems like a mystery to us earthbound animals. But, paraphrasing Robert May, he says that “To a first approximation, all animal species fly.” That’s because (as May actually said) “To a first approximation, all species are insects.”

In addition to insects, flight has evolved in pterosaurs, birds and bats. An obvious first step in the evolution of flight is gliding, as seen in mammals (flying squirrels in North America, sugar gliders and feathertail gliders in Australia, colugos in the Philippines), reptiles (Draco volans and the paradise tree snake) and amphibians (Wallace's flying frog). Mammals do this by means of a patagium.

Another possibility is that early birds flew in fits and starts, as some birds still do today. Either way, improvements in a species’ ability to fly would be honed by natural selection, until they were capable of sustained flight. Flight evolved not in one fell swoop, but through a series of intermediates. This happened several times independently. Such independent invention is called convergent evolution.

5. The Forty-Fold Path to Enlightenment

Dawkins describes the evolution of the eye. By Michael F. Land's estimation, this has occurred at least forty times, another example of convergent evolution.

Many unicellular organisms have an eyespot. Many animals have a patch of light sensitive cells. From so simple a beginning, endless forms of eyes have evolved. Natural selection favors the formation of a concave or convex cup, as it allows an organism to detect the direction of light. Such cup eyes are seen in planarians, bivalve molluscs, polychaete worms and limpets. Narrowing the opening allows for better resolution, as seen in the pinhole camera eye of the chambered Nautilus. A lens focuses light, as seen in its cousins, squids and octopuses. Even a layer of vitreous humor to protect photosensitive cells functions as a crude lens, and could be honed by natural selection. The cephalopod eye is a camera eye like the one used by vertebrates, but evolved convergently. In it, the photosensitive cells point the right way. In vertebrates, the optic nerve leaves through a hole in the retina, resulting in a blind spot. But evolution tinkers with existing body plans rather than starting from scratch. The vertebrate eye, once it evolved, was too useful to be discarded, despite its flawed design. There’s no descending Mount Improbable.

Dan-Eric Nillson and Susanne Pelger estimate that complex eyes can evolve in “only a few hundred thousand years”, a blink in the eye of geologic time.

6. The Museum of All Shells

Dawkins explores the shapes of shells in snails and other animals. Borrowing from Borges’s "The Library of Babel" (containing all possible books), Dan Dennet has imagined a Library of Mendel (all possible animal forms.) Needless to say, most of these forms are not realized in nature. Why not? Dawkins considers various answers to this question.

7. Kaleidoscopic Embryos

Dawkins explores embryology and the evolution of arthropod body plans. He uses the metaphor of a kaleidoscope in that a simple change can be “reflected” in complex ways. Arthropods are built from simple repeating patterns, but from those patterns there are many possible permutations (as Robert May noted earlier.)

8. Pollen Grains and Magic Bullets

Dawkins discusses the evolution of relations between bees and flowers. Many flowers produce nectar to lure bees into pollinating them. Some have evolved subtler lures. Oenothera has evolved ultraviolet patterns invisible to us but not to bees, which see in ultraviolet light. Orchids of the genus Ophrys are known as bee orchids because they have evolved to resemble a female bee. They have done so to lure male bees in to trying to mate with them. Bucket orchids produce a liquid that attracts orchid bees. The bee falls into the liquid; as it escapes from the orchid, it deposits its pollen sacs on the bee’s back. Orchids present endless examples of coevolution, by which species evolve together.

9. The Robot Replicator

Dawkins returns to the theme of The Selfish Gene, that organisms are replicators built by survival machines (genes.) A virus exists to make copies of itself. He touches on nanotechnology.

10. A Garden Inclosed

Dawkins describes the coevolution of figs and the wasps that pollinate them. A fig, as Dawkins describes, contains multitudes.

== Reception ==
Valerius Geist writes of "The Forty-Fold Path to Enlightenment": "It is a masterpiece. Like much of this book, this chapter was screened by colleagues who had the expertise to insure accuracy, and whose help Mr. Dawkins properly acknowledges. A skilled writer and spellbinding storyteller, he summarizes current research to explain how structures like spider webs, organs of flight and sight, snail shells or the complex mutualism of fig trees and tiny wasps that act as pollinators could evolve." He notes a few "problems with the book that may not interest a general reader" but that "Mr. Dawkins might help to dispel from receptive minds ignorant criticism of evolution. If so, his book will be of service to science and society."

Mark Ridley writes "Dawkins is a genius of science popularization. If you have not read one of his books before, Climbing Mount Improbable is a wonderful place to begin: it is non-stop mental and literary pleasure."

A review in New Scientist writes: "With an eye for drama, and ample talent to instruct, this is vintage Dawkins. The anthropomorphism is rampant; so too is the ultra-reductionist, gene-centred evolutionary scenario; but hugely readable for all that." It concludes "It may seem churlish to find fault with a book that so eloquently expounds the subtle complexities and mysteries of biology. But for me, Dawkins’s work (and I would include his new role as Professor of Public Understanding of Science at Oxford) would lose nothing, and gain much, by an acknowledgement that biology, at the level he has chosen to write about it, does not speak with a single and oracular voice."

John Horgan writes of "A Garden Inclosed": "His description toward the end of Climbing Mount Improbable of wasps enmeshed in Byzantine power struggles with fig trees is a model of nature writing, at once lyrical and lucid."

== See also ==
- On Growth and Form (1917), book on morphogenesis by D'Arcy Wentworth Thompson
- "On Being the Right Size" (1926), essay by J. B. S. Haldane
- Growing Up in the Universe (1991), Dawkins's Royal Institution Christmas Lectures
