= Unweaving the Rainbow =

Book by Richard Dawkins

- Cover of the first edition
- Author: Richard Dawkins
- Language: English
- Subject: Evolutionary biology
- Publisher: Houghton Mifflin
- Publication date: 1998
- Publication place: United Kingdom
- Media type: Print
- Pages: 336 pp.
- ISBN: 0-618-05673-4
- OCLC: 45155530
- Preceded by: Climbing Mount Improbable
- Followed by: A Devil's Chaplain

Unweaving the Rainbow: Science, Delusion and the Appetite for Wonder is a 1998 book by the evolutionary biologist Richard Dawkins, in which the author discusses the relationship between science and the arts from the perspective of a scientist.

Dawkins addresses the misperception that science and art are at odds. Driven by the responses to his books The Selfish Gene and The Blind Watchmaker wherein readers resented his naturalistic world view, seeing it as depriving life of meaning, Dawkins felt the need to explain that, as a scientist, he saw the world as full of wonders and a source of pleasure. This pleasure was not in spite of, but rather because he does not assume as cause the inexplicable actions of a deity but rather the understandable laws of nature.

His starting point is John Keats's well-known, light-hearted accusation that Isaac Newton destroyed the poetry of the rainbow by 'reducing it to the prismatic colours.' See Keats's poem Lamia and Edgar Allan Poe's To Science. Dawkins's agenda is to show the reader that science does not destroy, but rather discovers poetry in the patterns of nature.

== Summary ==
=== Preface ===
It is of little concern whether or not science can prove that the ultimate fate of the cosmos lacks purpose: we live our lives regardless at a "human" level, according to ambitions and perceptions which come more naturally. Therefore, science should not be feared as a sort of cosmological wet blanket. In fact, those in search of beauty or poetry in their cosmology need not turn to the paranormal or even necessarily restrict themselves to the mysterious: science itself, the business of unravelling mysteries, is beautiful and poetic. (The rest of the preface sketches an outline of the book, makes acknowledgements, etc.)

=== The anaesthetic of familiarity ===
==== Opening lines ====
"We are going to die, and that makes us the lucky ones. Most people are never going to die because they are never going to be born. The potential people who could have been here in my place but who will in fact never see the light of day outnumber the sand grains of Arabia. Certainly those unborn ghosts include greater poets than Keats, greater scientists than Newton. We know this because the set of possible people allowed by our DNA so massively outnumbers the set of actual people. In the teeth of these stupefying odds it is you and I, in our ordinariness, that are here. We privileged few, who won the lottery of birth against all odds, how dare we whine at our inevitable return to that prior state from which the vast majority have never stirred?"

==== Summary ====
The first chapter describes several ways in which the universe appears beautiful and poetic when viewed scientifically. However, it first introduces an additional reason to embrace science. Time and space are vast, so the probability that the reader came to be alive here and now, as opposed to another time or place, was slim. More important, the probability that the reader came to be alive at all were even slimmer: the correct structure of atoms had to align in the universe. Given how special these circumstances are, the "noble" thing to do is employ the allotted several decades of human life towards understanding that universe. Rather than simply feeling connected with nature, one should rise above this "anaesthetic of familiarity" and observe the universe scientifically.

=== Drawing room of dukes ===
This chapter describes a third reason to embrace science (the first two being beauty and duty): improving one's performance in the arts. Science is often presented publicly in a translated format, "dumbed down" to fit the language and existing ideas of non-scientists. This offers a disservice to the public, who are capable of appreciating the beauty of the universe as deeply as a scientist can. The successful communication of unadulterated science enhances, not confuses, the arts; after all, poets (Dawkins's synonym for artists—see page 24) and scientists are motivated by a similar spirit of wonder. We should therefore battle the stereotype that science is difficult, uncool, and not useful for the common person.

=== Barcodes in the stars ===
Studying a phenomenon, such as a flower, cannot detract from its beauty. First, some scientists, such as Feynman, are able to appreciate the aesthetics of the flower while engaged in their study. Second, the mysteries which science unfolds lead to new and more exciting mysteries; for example, botany's findings might lead us to wonder about the workings of a fly's consciousness. This effect of multiplying mysteries should satisfy even those who think that scientific understanding is at odds with aesthetics, e.g. people who agree with Einstein that "the most beautiful thing we can experience is the mysterious". (For evidence, the rest of this chapter discusses the fascinating science and beautiful new mysteries which followed in the wake of Newton's "unweaving" of the rainbow, e.g. his explanation of the prismatic effects of moist air.)

=== Barcodes on the air ===
This chapter offers more evidence that science is fun and poetic, by exploring sound waves, birdsong, and low-frequency phenomena such as pendula and periodic mass extinctions.

=== Barcodes at the bar ===
A fourth reason to embrace science is that it can help deliver justice in a court of law, via DNA fingerprinting or even via simple statistical reasoning.

Everyone should learn the scientist's art of probability assessment, to make better decisions.

=== Hoodwink'd with faery fancy ===
This chapter explores what Dawkins considers to be fallacies in astrology, religion, magic, and extraterrestrial visitations. Credulity and Hume's criterion are also discussed.

=== Unweaving the uncanny ===
Amazing coincidences are much more common than we may think, and sometimes, when over-interpreted, they lead to faulty conclusions. Statistical significance tests can help determine which patterns are meaningful.

=== Huge cloudy symbols of a high romance ===
Unlike "magisterial poetry" (where metaphors and pretty language are used to describe the familiar), "pupillary poetry" uses poetic imagery to assist a scientist's thinking about the exotic (e.g. consider "being" an electron temporarily). Although it is useful, some authors take pupillary poetry too far, and, "drunk on metaphor", they produce "bad science"; i.e. postulate faulty theories. This is powered by humanity's natural tendency to look for representations.

=== The selfish cooperator ===
Genes compete with each other, but this occurs within the context of collaboration, as is shown with examples involving mitochondria, bacteria, and termites. Two types of collaboration are co-adaptation (tailoring simultaneously the different parts of an organism, such as flower colour and flower markings), and co-evolution (two species changing together; e.g. predator and prey running speeds may increase together in a sort of arms race).

=== The Genetic Book of the Dead ===
The body of any organism provides clues about its habitat. The genes allow one to reconstruct a picture of the range of ways of life that the species has experienced; in this sense DNA would act as a palimpsestic "digital archive" if only its language of encoding history could be fully understood. Finally, the curious genetics of cuckoos is discussed.

=== Reweaving the world ===
The brain is akin to a powerful computer, which creates a sort of virtual reality to model economically the environment. Neural circuitry is discussed, and a comparison is made between brains and genes: albeit over different time scales, both record the environment's past to help the organism make the optimal actions in the (predicted) future.

=== The balloon of the mind ===
The simultaneous explosions in hardware and software of the 20th century are together an example of what Dawkins calls "self-feeding co-evolution". A similar event occurred over a longer time scale (millions of years) when the minds and brains of our ancestors simultaneously improved very rapidly. Five possible triggers of this improvement were: language, map reading, ballistics, memes, and metaphors/analogies.

==== Conclusion ====
The final two paragraphs of The balloon of the mind conclude by saying that human beings are the only animal with a sense of purpose in life, and that that purpose should be to construct a comprehensive model of how the universe works.

== Petwhac ==
The book coins the acronymical term, petwhac, short for "Population of Events That Would Have Appeared Coincidental". Dawkins suggests that when one encounters an extremely unlikely coincidence, it should be considered in the broader context of other, similar events which would also have seemed coincidental.

An example would be a person on a foreign holiday encountering a friend they had not seen for years. In isolation this may feel like an impossible coincidence, but considering the wider petwhac (meeting any friend from around the same period, or meeting an acquaintance, or not meeting them but being told weeks later that they had been in the same city at that time) the true odds are more likely. In short, the bigger the petwhac, the stronger case you have to avoid ascribing something to fate or coincidence.

Dawkins offers several examples of petwhacs in the book, two of which are the bedside clock of a woman (Richard Feynman's wife) stopping exactly when she died, and a psychic who stops the watches of his television audience.

The first is explained by the fact that the clock had a mechanical defect which made it stop when tilted off the horizontal, which is what a nurse did to read the time of death in poor lighting conditions. The matter of the watches, in Dawkins's own words, is explained thus —

If somebody's watch stopped three weeks after the spell was cast, even the most credulous would prefer to put it down to chance. We need to decide how large a delay would have been judged by the audience as sufficiently simultaneous with the psychic's announcement to impress. About five minutes is certainly safe, especially since he can keep talking to each caller for a few minutes before the next call ceases to seem roughly simultaneous. There are about 100,000 five-minute periods in a year. The probability that any given watch, say mine, will stop in a designated five-minute period is about 1 in 100,000. Low odds, but there are 10 million people watching the show. If only half of them are wearing watches, we could expect about 25 of those watches to stop in any given minute. If only a quarter of these ring into the studio, that is 6 calls, more than enough to dumbfound a naïve audience. Especially when you add in the calls from people whose watches stopped the day before, people whose watches didn't stop but whose grandfather clocks did, people who died of heart attacks and their bereaved relatives phoned in to say that their 'ticker' gave out, and so on.
