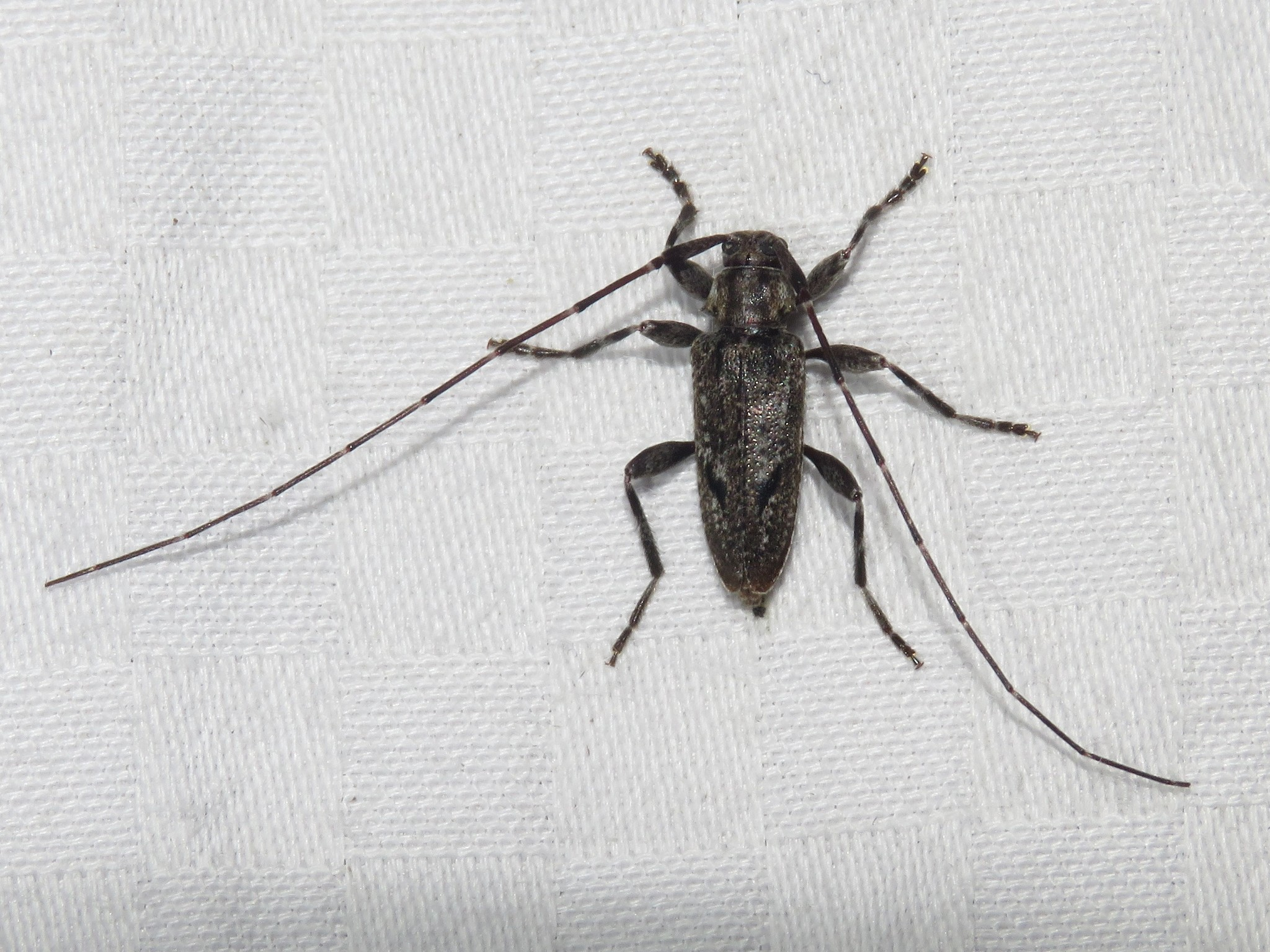
- Eutrichillus biguttatus

Scientific classification
- Domain: Eukaryota
- Kingdom: Animalia
- Phylum: Arthropoda
- Class: Insecta
- Order: Coleoptera
- Suborder: Polyphaga
- Infraorder: Cucujiformia
- Family: Cerambycidae
- Subfamily: Lamiinae
- Tribe: Acanthocinini
- Genus: Eutrichillus; Bates, 1885

Type species
- Eleothinus comus Bates, 1881

Synonyms
- Ceratographis Gahan, 1888; Lepturgoides Schaeffer, 1905

= Eutrichillus =

Genus of beetles

Eutrichillus is a genus of longhorn beetles of the subfamily Lamiinae. It was described by Henry Walter Bates in 1885.

== Taxonomy ==
Species:

- Eutrichillus biguttatus (LeConte, 1852)
- Eutrichillus brevipilus Chemsak & Linsley, 1986
- Eutrichillus canescens Dillon, 1956
- Eutrichillus comus (Bates, 1881)
- Eutrichillus neomexicanus (Champlain & Knull, 1925)
- Eutrichillus pini (Schaeffer, 1905)
