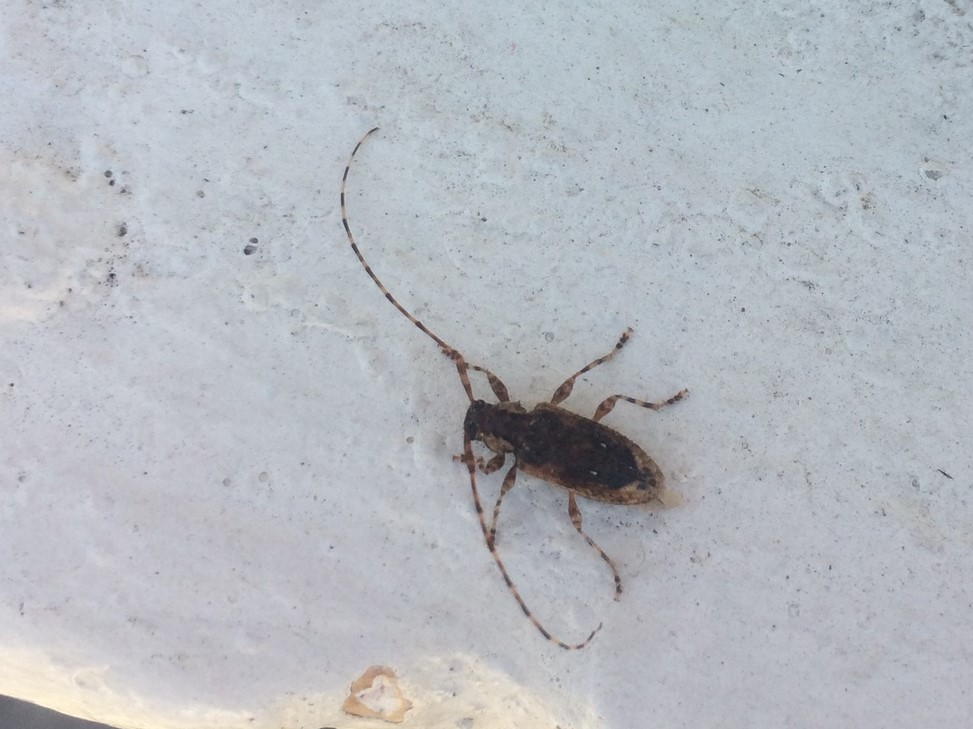

Scientific classification
- Domain: Eukaryota
- Kingdom: Animalia
- Phylum: Arthropoda
- Class: Insecta
- Order: Coleoptera
- Suborder: Polyphaga
- Infraorder: Cucujiformia
- Family: Cerambycidae
- Genus: Eutrichillus
- Species: E. comus

Binomial name
- Eutrichillus comus (Bates, 1881)

= Eutrichillus comus =

Species of beetle

Eutrichillus comus is a species of longhorn beetles of the subfamily Lamiinae. It was described by Bates in 1881, and is known from western Mexico, Honduras, and El Salvador.
