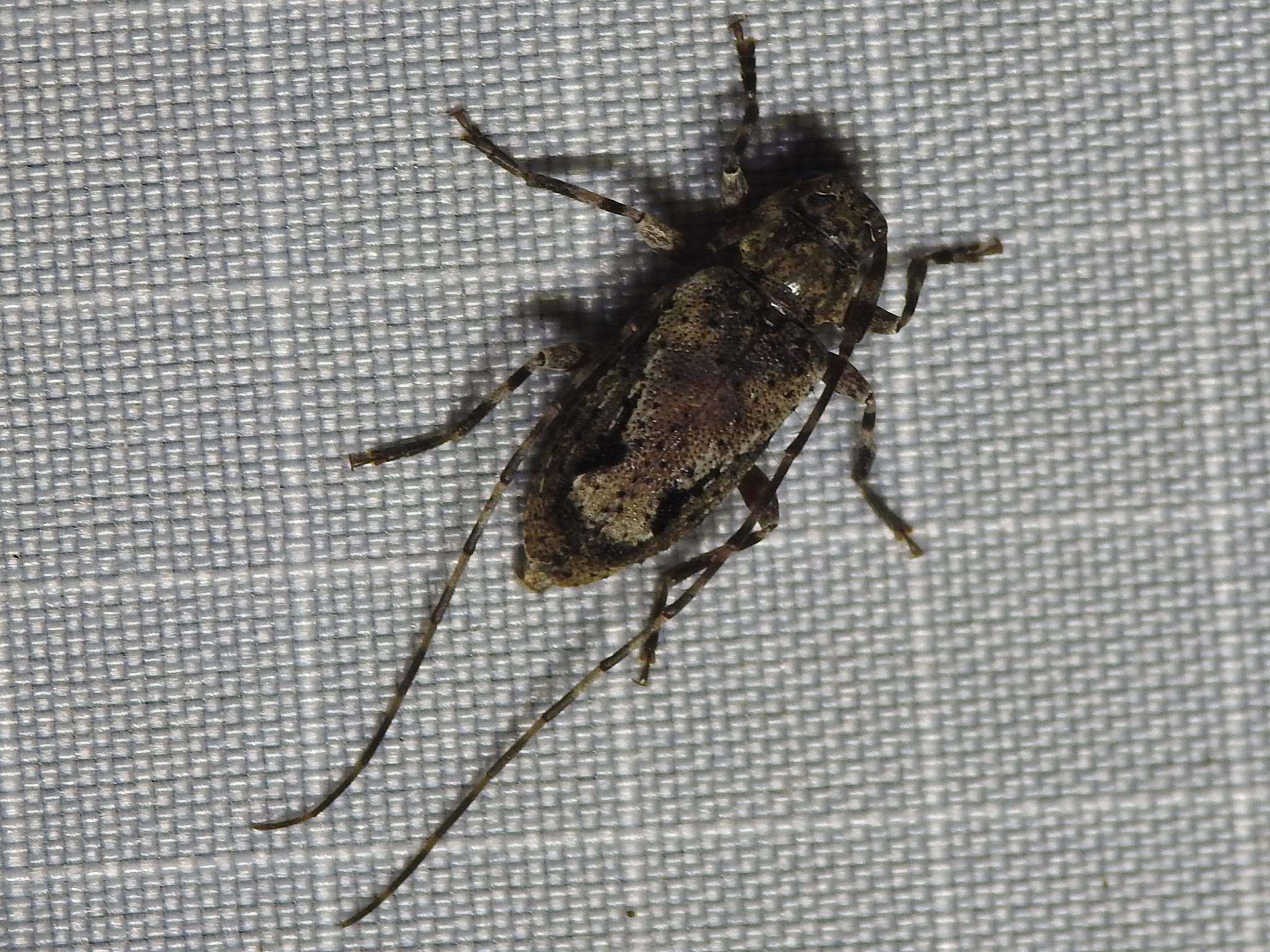

Scientific classification
- Domain: Eukaryota
- Kingdom: Animalia
- Phylum: Arthropoda
- Class: Insecta
- Order: Coleoptera
- Suborder: Polyphaga
- Infraorder: Cucujiformia
- Family: Cerambycidae
- Genus: Eutrichillus
- Species: E. canescens

Binomial name
- Eutrichillus canescens Dillon, 1956

= Eutrichillus canescens =

Species of beetle

Eutrichillus canescens is a species of longhorn beetles of the subfamily Lamiinae. It was described by Dillon in 1956.
