= Growing Up in the Universe =

1991 television film

- Cover of the DVD
- Written by: Richard Dawkins
- Directed by: Stuart McDonald
- Starring: Richard Dawkins
- Music by: Roger Bolton
- Country of origin: United Kingdom
- Original language: English

Production
- Producers: William Woollard and Richard Melman for InCa Productions
- Editor: Roger Collings
- Running time: 300 minutes

Original release
- Release: 1991

Related
- The Root of All Evil?

Growing Up in the Universe was a series of televised public lectures given by British evolutionary biologist Richard Dawkins as part of the Royal Institution Christmas Lectures, in which he discussed the evolution of life in the universe. The lectures were first broadcast on the BBC in 1991, in the form of five one-hour episodes.

The Richard Dawkins Foundation for Reason and Science was granted the rights to the televised lectures, and a DVD version was released by the foundation on 20 April 2007.

Dawkins' book Climbing Mount Improbable (1996) was developed from the ideas presented in the lectures, and the title itself was taken from the third lecture in the series.

== Parts ==
=== Part 1: Waking Up in the Universe ===
Dawkins discusses the amazing capabilities of the human brain and contrasts these with the limited capabilities of computers and other man-made machines. He notes that "the brain is a kind of computer, but it's a computer such as no human factory has ever turned out."

He uses a small totem pole (which is used in ancestor worship) to illustrate the importance of studying our ancestors to understand how we've evolved. To contrast ease of reproduction with the difficulty of becoming an ancestor, Dawkins uses the example of paper folding to explain exponential growth. Dawkins then tells the audience that exponential growth does not generally happen in the real world – natural factors come into play which control the population numbers, meaning that only an elite group of organisms will actually become distant ancestors. To be in this elite group, the organism must "have what it takes" to survive and pass on their genes to offspring.

The long chain of successful ancestors means that the probability of our existence is very small, and we are lucky to be alive. By turning down the lights and shining a small spotlight on a large ruler in front of him, Dawkins illustrates the darkness of the distant past and of the unknown future. After expounding on how lucky we are to be alive, and urging us not to waste the precious time that we have, Dawkins brings up the usefulness of science in aiding our understanding of the universe. He mentions that Michael Faraday, founder of the Christmas Lectures, was asked by Sir Robert Peel when asked about the use of science. Faraday's response was "What is the use of a baby?" Dawkins explains that Faraday was either referring to the vast potential of a baby, or to the idea that there must be something more to life than growing up, working, getting old, and dying. There must be a point to it all; Perhaps science can uncover the answers to our biggest questions.

He asks how we can shake off the "anesthetic of familiarity." He says we cannot yet visit other planets, but we can visit regions of our own planet so unfamiliar they might as well be another planet. Dawkins shows the audience Carl Sagan's imaginings of hypothetical lifeforms on Jupiter. He compares them to strange terrestrial organisms which he humorously nicknames "By-Jovians," since they're strange enough to be from Jupiter: an anglerfish and other deepsea fish that shine by bioluminescence. He quotes a colleague on octopuses: "These are the Martians". Cuttlefish are no less strange. He shows how the common insect body plan has been molded to strange shapes.

More strange forms are found on small scales. He uses a scanning electron microscope to look at small organisms including dust mites, mosquitoes, and a bee being parasitized by a strepsiptera.

Strangeness can be found in the human body. He presents a picture of a human neurons and the "bewildering forest of connections between them." He notes that the total length of nerve cells in a human brain, laid end to end, would stretch around the world 25 times. "But what's truly impressive about the nervous system is not the sheer number of elements, but their connections." Using a model of a eukaryotic cell, he discusses the mitochondria and presents the audience with a complicated diagram of the metabolic pathways. In the cell nucleus is the master molecule, DNA. He describes DNA's information carrying ability: every time you eat a steak, "your teeth are shredding the equivalent of a billion copies of the Encyclopedia Britannica." He shows a hemoglobin molecule, a vehicle for carrying oxygen.

Dawkins suggests that we can also shake off the familiarity by stepping backwards in time. Short of a time machine, we have to use fossils, exemplified by a trilobite, which is about 500 million years old. Dawkins admits: I can have no conception how old it is." "When we come to millennia, thousands of years, our spines start to tingle. Epic myths like Homer's Odyssey, tales of the Greek gods Zeus and Apollo, the Jewish heroes Moses and Joshua and their God Yawheh, the Ancient Egyptians and the Sun God Ra, these all give us an eerie of immense age. We feel we're peering back into the mists of antiquity. Yet on the timescale of this fossil, those mists of antiquity don't even count as yesterday."

He tries to give a scale of time, startig with the first Christmas. By using a single pace to represent going back 1000 years, he starts at year zero and takes four steps in front of his desk, going back to 4000 BCE. Pointing to a portrait of Homo habilis, he states that to go back to the time of habilis, he would have to walk about two kilometers. He has audience members hold up portraits of other human ancestors, telling them how far he would have to walk to get back to the time of each one: Ramapithecus, an ancestor of the apes, would be about 14 kilometers away. Early primates would be in Hemel Hempstead, early mammals in Lutton, Lincolnshire, insectivores in Newport Pagnell, synapsida in Manchester, amphibians in Middlesbrough, early tetrapods in Carlisle. To find Pikaia, you'd have to go Glasgow. To get to the earliest bacteria, 3.5 billion years ago, we'd have to "march all the way from here to Moscow. He shows a model of the tree of life. The genetic code is universal, and allows us to see how closely related species are.

By imagining what an advanced alien species would think of humans if they were to arrive on Earth, Dawkins suggests that their science would be similar to ours, since the laws of physics are universal. They would know about pi, the Pythagorean theorem, and the theory of relativity ("although they won't attribute it to Einstein.") However, Dawkins argues that the alien anthropologists would most likely scoff at our local, parochial religious beliefs. He then contrasts evidence-based beliefs with revealed, tradition-based, and authority-based beliefs.

To explain the problem with beliefs in the supernatural, Dawkins conducts a small experiment with the audience to "find the psychic." Using a coin, he assigns half the audience to will it to land on heads, and assigns the other half to will it to land on tails. After each flip, the section of the audience that was wrong is eliminated from the experiment, and he repeats the experiment using the remainder. After eight coin flips, only one boy in the audience remains. Dawkins then asks the question "Is he psychic?" Obviously, because of how the experiment was set up, one person was bound to have been correct about the result of each coin flip. Dawkins argues that this is exactly how seemingly supernatural events occur in the real world, especially when the "audience" is the entire population of the planet.

To conclude the lecture, Dawkins claims that there is nothing wrong with having faith in a proper scientific prediction. To illustrate this, he takes a cannonball which has been suspended from the ceiling with a rope, pulls it aside and touches it to his forehead. He announces that he is going to release the cannonball, letting it swing away from him, and that when it comes back to him, he is going to ignore his natural instinct to run because he has faith in his scientific prediction of what will happen – the cannonball should stop about an inch short of his forehead. He releases the cannonball, and his prediction is proved correct.

=== Part 2: Designed and Designoid Objects ===
Dawkins' second lecture examines the problem of design. He presents a number of simple objects, such as rocks and crystals, and notes that these objects have been formed by simple laws of physics and are therefore not designed. He then examines some designed objects – including a microscope, an electronic calculator, a pocket watch, and a clay pot – and notes that none of these objects could have possibly come about by sheer luck. Dawkins then discusses what he calls "designoid objects", which are complex objects that are neither simple, nor designed. Not only are they complex on the outside, they are also complex on the inside – perhaps billions of times more complex than a designed object such as a microscope.

Dawkins then shows the audience a number of designed and designoid objects, including the pitcher plant, megalithic mounds built by the compass termite, and pots made by trapdoor spiders, potter wasps, and mason bees. He examines some designoid objects that use camouflage, such as a grasshopper that looks like a stone, a sea horse that looks like sea weed, a leaf insect, a green snake, a stick insect, and a collection of butterflies that look like dead leaves when their wings are closed. Dawkins notes that many animals share similar types of camouflage or protection because of convergent evolution. Examples of such designoid objects include the hedgehog and the spiny anteater (both of which evolved pointed spines along their back) and the Tasmanian wolf (which looks like a dog but is actually a marsupial). He illustrates the reason for convergent evolution by using two small models of commercial aircraft. The reason they look similar isn't due to industrial espionage, it is due to the fact that they are both built to fly, so they must make use of similar design principles.

Using a camera and a model eye, Dawkins then compares the designed camera with the designoid eye. Both are involved in similar processes – using a lens to direct light onto a film or a retina. Both the camera and the eye also have an iris, which is used to control the amount of light which is allowed in. Using a volunteer from the audience, Dawkins demonstrates the contraction of the human iris by shining a light into her right eye.

The lecture then moves into an explanation of natural selection, which brings forth designoid objects. To explain natural selection, Dawkins first explains artificial selection by discussing the evolution of wild cabbage into broccoli, cauliflower, cabbage, red cabbage, kohlrabi, and Brussels sprouts. He continues the discussion of artificial selection by explaining the evolution of the ancestral wolf into the many varieties of modern dog. Starting with the ancestral wolf, Dawkins imagines that everyone on one side of the room is breeding for small wolves, while everyone on the other side is breeding for big wolves. By selectively breeding the smallest or largest of each litter for a number of years, you may eventually end up with something like the Chihuahua on one side of the room, and something like a Great Dane on the other.

Dawkins then introduces an Arthromorphs computer program (similar to the Biomorphs program), explaining how it works while a volunteer uses the computer to selectively breed more and more generations.

At this point, Dawkins switches from explaining artificial selection to explaining natural selection. To demonstrate natural selection in a computer program, Dawkins uses a program written by Peter Fuchs to simulate the evolution of the spiderweb. The program builds "genetic" variations of a parent web, as if the web was actually being built by a child spider. For each generation, a simulation is run which randomly generates flies – some of which will hit the web, and others that will miss it. The child web that is able to capture the highest number of flies is selected as the parent for the next generation of webs. Dawkins shows the audience the "fossil record" that the program recorded after simulating a large number of generations overnight. The web starts off very simple and inefficient, but by the end it has evolved into a web that is highly efficient and highly complex. This is the same process that has led to the existence of all designoid objects.

Dawkins discusses creationism the most popular alternative to natural selection. He explains that creationists mistakenly believe designoid objects to be designed objects created by a divine being. Quoting from William Paley's Natural Theology, Dawkins discusses the argument from design using the example of the watch and the watchmaker. Even though designoid objects appear to be designed, Darwin proved that this is not the case. Although Darwin's theory was discovered well after Paley developed his watchmaker argument, Dawkins explains that the argument of a divine watchmaker was still a bad argument, even in Paley's day. Paraphrasing David Hume, Dawkins explains that anything capable of creating humans must itself be highly complicated. Thus, the argument from design actually explains nothing – "shooting itself in the foot." While it is true that designoid objects cannot come about by chance, evolution provides a non-random method of creation – namely, natural selection.

After developing the argument against a divine creator, Dawkins examines a number of designoid objects that contain imperfections, which is something you would not expect to find in an object that is supposedly created by a divine being. Showing the audience a halibut flatfish, he explains how they evolved from an upright swimming ancestor with one eye on each side of the head into a bottom-hugging flatfish with a distorted set of eyes on one side of the body. Dawkins claims that this is poorly designed, as any proper engineer would design an organism more like a skate, which flattened out on its belly instead of on its side. This is an example of something you would expect from an evolved/designoid object, but not something you would expect from a created/designed object.

Using labeled building blocks, Dawkins shows the audience how designed objects came to be. He starts off by placing the simple block on the bottom, and explaining that you don't have to start with a complex being, but can start with a very simple foundation. If you have a simple foundation, you can place the next block on top – the designoid block. From this block, you can get complex organisms. Only after complex designoid objects come to be can you get the final building block of design (microscopes, clay pots, etc.). He argues that only humans are capable of true design. The pots of the potter wasps were built by instinct, instincts shaped by natural selection. An exception comes from the engineer Ingo Rechenberg, who designs by Darwinian principles.

=== Part 3: Climbing Mount Improbable ===
Dawkins starts the lecture with a stick insect on his hand. Other examples of camouflage are leaf insects, a Potoo, which looks like a tree branch and a thorn bug, which gains protection by looking like a rose thorn. He explains that its imitation of its environment is specific, like a key fitting a lock.

He notes that "There is something intrinsically improbable about the lock and key." He shows a combination lock with three dials, each with six positions. The odds of opening it by luck are 1 in 216. But if it is a gradualistic combination lock, with dials that can be opened individually, the odds are 1 in 18. "If nature is a combination lock, it is a gradualistic combination lock."

He discusses the infinite monkey theorem. He notes that the odds of a monkey typing even a single line of Shakespeare are infinitesimal. He discusses Fred Hoyle's proverbial hurricane in a junkyard producing a Boeing 747. Dawkins notes that evolution proceeds by gradual steps. He presents two computer programs, "Hoyle" and "Darwin", and asks them to generate a phrase from Shakespeare. Hoyle generates letters randomly. Darwin does the same, but "breeds" offspring with mutations. It selects for mutations that resemble the target phrase, however slightly. Darwin reaches the target phrase in 158 generations. He admits that this is a bit of a cheat, as the program has a target in mind, while natural selection is blind. Nevertheless, it shows the importance of cumulative nonrandom selection.

Evolution proceeds through gradual steps, rather than large leaps. This is illustrated by the model of Mount Improbable. At the peak of Mount Improbable is a sophisticated adaptation like the vertebrate eye. Dawkins shows that it is ascended by gradual steps.

Dawkins explains that organisms climb Mount Improbable "through an extremely large number of generations." This works only if there is reproduction with true heredity. Dawkins illustrates the difference between the reproduction of inanimate phenomena, such as fires that spread through sparks, with organisms that transmit traits through DNA. The gradual evolutionary adaption of these organisms is demonstrated through the examples of the eye, the wing and camouflage.

The gradual evolution of the eye is shown, starting with a simple light sensitive surface. Natural selection would favor the formation of a cup eye. Such an eye is seen in the pinhole camera eye of a nautilus. The addition of a lens resulted in a camera eye in its cousin the octopus. The cephalopod eye evolved independently of ours, another example of convergent evolution.

The gradual evolution of the wing is shown. Even a wing-stub is adaptive, as it allows for things like gliding. Such controlled gliding has evolved several times, as evidenced by the flattened bodies of tree snakes, the web- like skin of flying squirrels and similar adaptions in flying lizards and colugos. Creationists ask: "What's the use of half a wing?" He notes that "Not only can you do well with a half a wing or a quarter of a wing, but lots of animals actually do." Flight provides another example of convergent evolution.

Dawkins returns to camouflage by showing that even a slight resemblance to a stick is adaptative, and can be selected for. So it is that a stick insect can evolve.

=== Part 4: The Ultraviolet Garden ===
Dawkins recalls asking a little girl "what she thought flowers were 'for'." She said that flowers are there for our benefit. Dawkins points out that many people throughout history have thought that the natural world existed for our benefit, with examples from Genesis and other literature. Douglas Adams, who is sitting in the audience, is called to read a relevant passage from his novel The Restaurant at the End of the Universe.

Dawkins then asks his audience to put off the idea that the natural world exists for our benefit. He shows that flowers have evolved to attract pollinators. Flowers have evolved ultraviolet patterns which are invisible to us but not to bees, which see in ultraviolet light. Dawkins uses an ultraviolet filter to show how a flower might look to a bee. Flowers use pollinators to transport pollen. To attract them, they produce nectar. Orchids have evolved elaborate adaptations to lure bees. He shows the orchid Drakaea, which has evolved to resemble a female wasp. Bucket orchids produce a liquid to attract orchid bees. The orchid traps the bee; as it escapes from the orchid, its pollen sac sticks to the bee.

He notes that bats, which navigate through echolocation, have a worldview even stranger to us. He demonstrates this through a bat detector. He asks us to imagine how the world would "look" to a bat.

He describes computer viruses, which exist only to make copies of themselves: "It spreads because it spreads because..." He notes that biological viruses are similar. They, too, exist only to be copied. But their instructions are written in the language of genes and are "written" by natural selection.

He shows a robot, and argues that living things "are machines built by DNA, whose purpose is to make more copies of the same DNA. How did it start? He goes back to the beginning, before biology, when there was only physics and chemistry. He discusses the primordial soup. He notes that the origin of life may have been unlikely, but only had to happen once. And it may have happened only on one planet out of a billion billion. "That was enough luck for it to have happened. Of course, if it did happen on only one planet anywhere in the universe, that planet had to be our planet, because here we are talking about it!"

He discusses the history of life, starting with bacteria, the simplest self-replicating machines on Earth today. He discusses the eukaryotic cell, which likely evolved via endosymbiosis. Mitochondria have their own DNA and split via binary fission, evidence that they are descended from free-living bacteria. He discusses the evolution of multicellularity, which can be modeled by colonies like Volvox.

He explains that organisms grow exponentially, illustrated by doubling coins on a chessboard: the first square has one, the second two, the third four, the fourth eight, the fifth sixteen... By the sixty-fourth square, the pile of coins would stretch to the star Alpha Centauri, four light years away. He notes that it only takes about fifty-seven cell generations to build a blue whale consisting of a hundred thousand trillion cells. He looks at the evolution of bodies, noting that in the evolution of humans from Homo habilis, the chin elongated.

He quotes K. Eric Drexler: "Modern scalpels and sutures are simply too coarse for repairing capillaries, cells and molecules." He says nanotechnology holds out the prospect of building surgical instruments to be on the same scale as the cells." He notes that as strange as nanotechnology seems to us, life existed on small scales long before it did on large scales.

Much as animals are colonies of cells, social insects form colonies for a single purpose. He shows various examples of eusociality: a "bivouac of army ants", a worker termite and a queen, the latter an "egg-laying machine", and honeypot ants, "specialized to act as honey stores." Their armor plates have been "stretched apart by this gigantic honey-pot" which "hangs from the roof of the nest like a lightbulb." He shows the caverns of leafcutter ants. These are all different means of passing genes.

He notes that "We began by asking what flowers were for. We considered various answers, and eventually concluded that flowers are for the same thing as everything else in the living kingdom: for spreading around 'Copy me' programs about, written in DNA language." He shows a macaw, and notes that its feathers evolved to attract the opposite sex: "Genes that make colored feathers tend to get passed on to future generations, because they are an effective advertisement to get mates who like those colored feathers." Similarly, genes for good wings are passed on, which is why most birds have wings that work. A plant passes on its genes by manipulating pollinators. From a plant's perspective, a bee exists to pass on plant genes. From the bee's perspective, a flower exists to provide nectar. From the beginning, the theme of "The Ultraviolet Garden" is seeing the world from a new perspective.

=== Part 5: The Genesis of Purpose ===
"Growing up means three things. First, it means the growing up of an individual, like you or me or a redwood tree. We all grow up from a tiny single cell, up to a massive edifice of hundreds of trillions of cells. … Secondly, growing up means the growing up of an entire lifeform on a planet, what we call its evolution. Evolution is a change we see only after a lot of generations, and see each generation after the other. The third sort of growing up is what this lecture is about. It's growing up in the sense of achieving a grownup understanding of the universe.

In order for a lifeform to have an understanding of the universe, it has to have the right apparatus. On our planet, that means a brain. When the brain becomes very large indeed, it becomes capable of understanding the universe."

Dawkins asks how our human brains evolved their peculiar capabilities. Before brains can become large enough to model the universe they must develop from intermediate forms. Dawkins discusses the digger wasp and the set of experiments conducted by Nikolaas Tinbergen of how the it models the local geography around its nest. He talks about the limitations of the digger wasps' brain and concludes that only the human brain is sufficiently developed to model large-scale phenomena about the world. He shows an MRI scan of a human brain (later revealed to be his own) and describes how an image develops from the eye onto the visual cortex.

Dawkins discusses how the image on the retina is upside-down and in two dimensions but the overlapping images from each of the eyes are composited to form a three-dimensional model in the brain. He shows this by asking the audience to focus on him while holding their hand at eye level which causes them to see two images of their hand; one from each eye. He then describes how, when using his finger to wriggle his eyeball, the outside world appears to move because he is moving the image on his retina. However this does not happen when he voluntarily rolls his eyes from side to side. This is because the brain uses the internal model to compensate for the relative change in position of images on the retina. Dawkins gets someone to wear a virtual reality headset and move around in a 3-D computer generated world. He draws an analogy between the model of the universe developed in one's head with the virtual reality universe developed in the computer.

He then goes on the show that the brain uses models to describe the universe by looking at how the brain interprets various optical illusions, such as the hollow-face illusion (here, a rotating hollow mask of Charlie Chaplin), the "impossible" geometry of a Penrose triangle, the shifting interpretations of the Necker cube and the ability of humans to findfaces in random shapes.

Dawkins discusses the evolution of the human brain. He shows an animation of the increasing skull size from Australopithecus to Homo habilis to Homo erectus and then finally to modern day Homo sapiens.

He discusses evolutionary arms races and coevolution and suggests something similar happened in the explosive evolution of our brains, what he calls "self-feeding coevolution." An analogy is in the computer, where hardware and software coevolve. Unlike computers, we cannot look directly at intermediates. Dawkins notes that we can look at "skulls and skills." Examples include arrowheads, cave paintings, cuneiform tablets and Robert Burton's The Anatomy of Melancholy. He asks: "What happened to make the human brain take off?"

The ability of a brain to run complex simulations is a powerful evolutionary advantage. Dawkins discusses this ability to model future events by showing a painting of a hypothetical Homo erectus trying to cross a gorge. She uses a mental model of a tree fallen across a gorge to reach a possible solution. He goes on to describe how the complex modelling ability of the brain may have developed due to this imaginative simulation of various possible scenarios or by the development of language, which would allow ideas to be passed from generation to generation, or by technology, which is an extension of human hands and eyes; or, indeed, if it is a combination of all three. But these tools are double-edged. He warns of the dangers of dogma, citing the prosecution of Galileo. He urges us to exercise skepticism, to distinguish good ideas from bad.

Dawkins concludes that purpose has arisen in the Universe due to human brains. The simulations developed in our brain allow us to develop intent and purpose; and over time our collective understanding of the Universe will improve as we continue to study and exchange ideas: "Purpose itself has arisen in the universe, has grown up in the universe recently. But purpose itself, now that it has arisen in human brains, has the potential to be yet another of those software innovations that is capable of taking off into a progressive, self-feeding spiral, especially when teams of humans share the same purpose." He shows footage of the lunar lander, "a magnificent example of what groups of human minds can do when they get together with a common purpose." He cites the recently announced Human Genome Project as another example. "Science itself, the understanding of the universe in which we've woken up, is another group purpose with almost limitless potential." He says that building a model of the Universe "is a shared enterprise. The model is distributed over a network of brains that are participating. Bits of the model are in books, in libraries, in pictures, in computer databases. As time goes by, and our civilization grows up more, our model of the universe we share with one another will get better, it will become progressively more accurate in its mirroring of reality. ... We, perhaps alone in the universe, are capable of finally growing up."

== Quotations ==
Life makes the wonders of technology seem commonplace. So where does life come from? What is it? Why are we here? What are we for? What is the meaning of life? There's a conventional wisdom which says that science has nothing to say about such questions. Well, all I can say is that if science has nothing to say, it's certain that no other discipline can say anything at all. But in fact, science has a great deal to say about such questions. And that's what these five lectures are going to be about. Life "grows up" in the universe by gradual degrees – evolution – and we grow up in our understanding of our origins and our meaning.

The present century is a tiny spotlight, inching its way along a gigantic ruler of time. Everything before the spotlight is the darkness of the dead past. Everything after the spotlight is in the darkness of the unknown future. We live in the spotlight. Of all the 200,000,000 centuries along the ruler of time, 199,999,999 centuries are in darkness. Only one is lit up, and that is the one in which we happen – by sheer luck – to be alive. The odds against our century happening to be the present century are the same as the odds against a penny tossed out at random on the road from London to Istanbul happening to fall on a particular ant.

We do of course, have an ordinary life to get on with. We do have a living to earn. We've got to earn our living being a solicitor or a lavatory cleaner or something like that. But nevertheless, it is worthwhile also from time to time shaking off the anaesthetic of familiarity and awakening to the wonder that is really all around us all the time.

Natural selection – nature – is constantly choosing which individual shall live, [and] which individual shall breed. And the result, after many generations of natural selection, is much the same as the result after many generations of artificial selection.

In any case, all creation, all design, all machines and houses and paintings and computers and airplanes, everything designed and made by us, everything made by other creatures, is only made possible because there are already brains put together as designoid objects – and designoid objects come about only through gradual evolution. Creation, when it does occur in the universe, is an afterthought. When creation appeared on this planet it came locally, and it came late. Creation does not belong in any account of the fundamentals of the universe. Creation is something that, rather late in the day, grows up in the universe.
