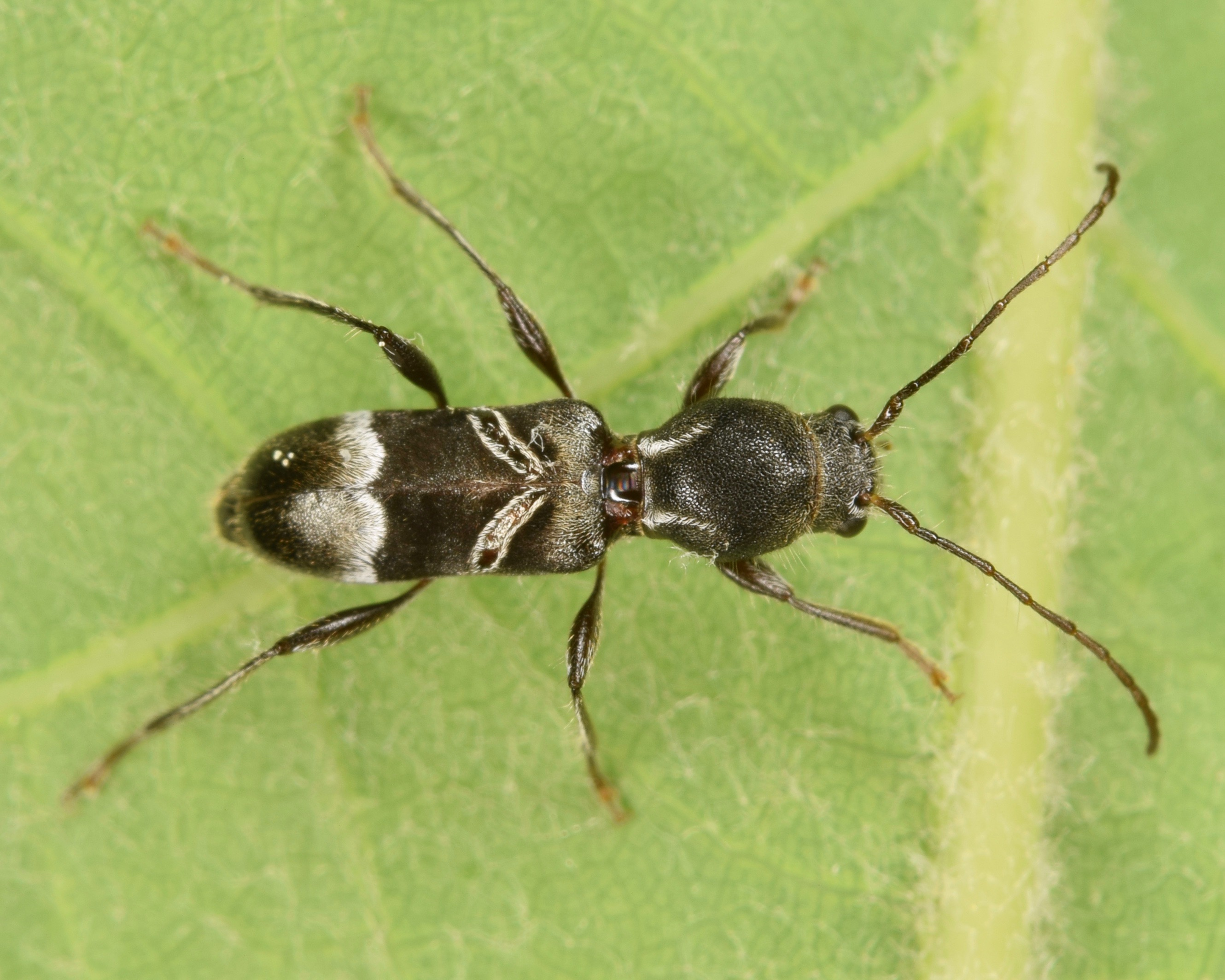

Scientific classification
- Domain: Eukaryota
- Kingdom: Animalia
- Phylum: Arthropoda
- Class: Insecta
- Order: Coleoptera
- Suborder: Polyphaga
- Infraorder: Cucujiformia
- Family: Cerambycidae
- Genus: Tilloclytus
- Species: T. geminatus

Binomial name
- Tilloclytus geminatus (Haldeman, 1847)

Synonyms
- Tilloclytus duplicatus LeConte 1850

= Tilloclytus geminatus =

Species of beetle

Tilloclytus geminatus is a species of longhorn beetle in the Cerambycinae subfamily. It was described by Haldeman in 1847. It is known from northeastern North America.
