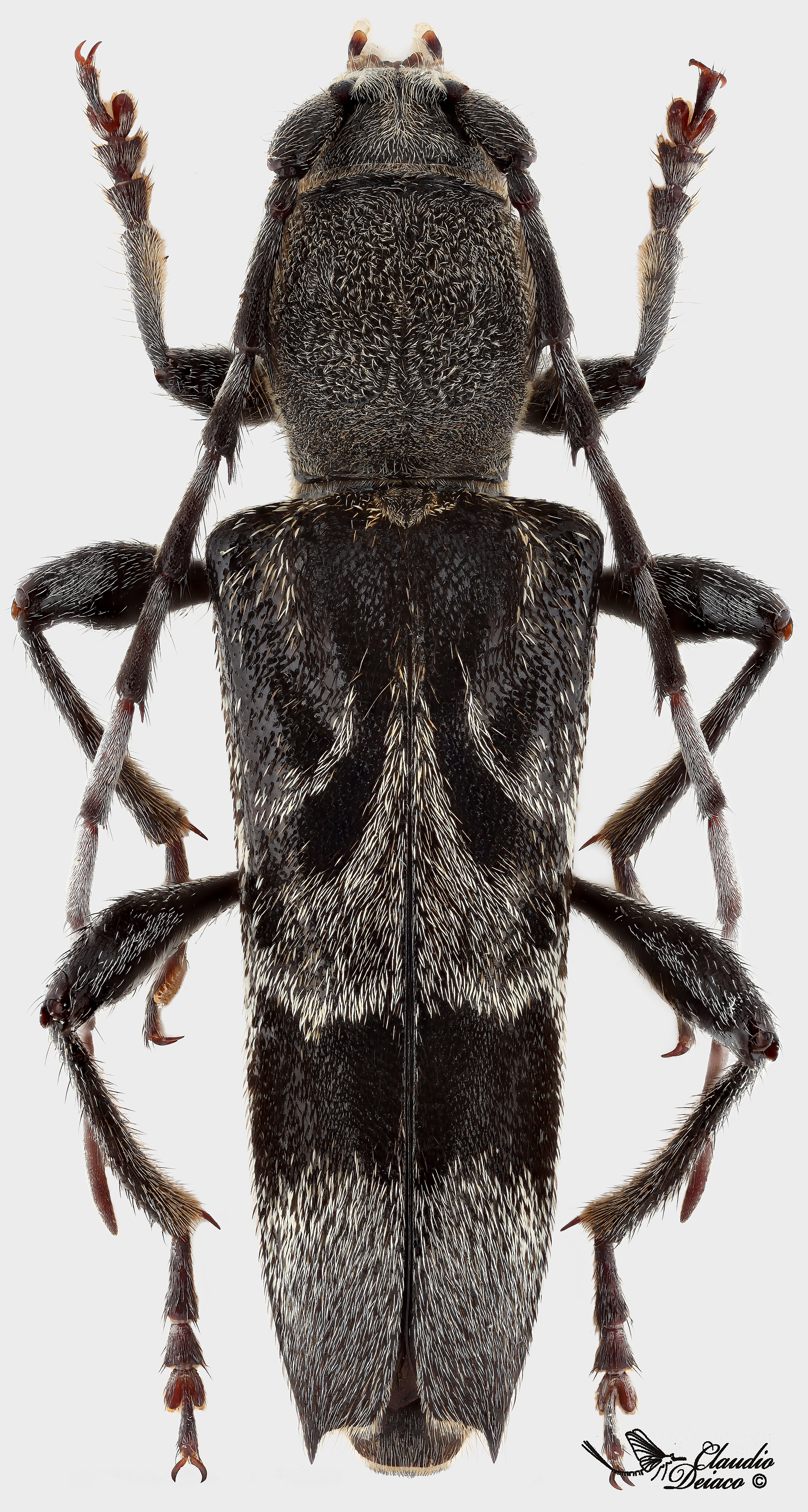
- Anaglyptus gibbosus

Scientific classification
- Domain: Eukaryota
- Kingdom: Animalia
- Phylum: Arthropoda
- Class: Insecta
- Order: Coleoptera
- Suborder: Polyphaga
- Infraorder: Cucujiformia
- Family: Cerambycidae
- Tribe: Anaglyptini
- Genus: Anaglyptus; Mulsant, 1839

Species
- See text

= Anaglyptus =

Genus of beetles

Anaglyptus is a genus of beetles in the family Cerambycidae. The scientific name of the genus was first validly published in 1839 by Mulsant.

== Species ==
The following species are accepted within Anaglyptus:

- Anaglyptus abieticola Holzschuh, 2003
- Anaglyptus ambiguus Holzschuh, 1992
- Anaglyptus annulicornis (Pic, 1933)
- Anaglyptus arabicus (Küster, 1847)
- Anaglyptus arakawae (Kano, 1933)
- Anaglyptus arcanus Miroshnikov, Bi & Lin, 2014
- Anaglyptus baeticus Verdugo, Lencina & Baena, 2019
- Anaglyptus bellus Matsumura & Matsushita, 1933
- Anaglyptus bicallosus (Kraatz, 1882)
- Anaglyptus colobotheoides Bates, 1884
- Anaglyptus confusus Holzschuh, 1999
- Anaglyptus croesus Pesarini & Sabbadini, 1997
- Anaglyptus danilevskii Miroshnikov, 2000
- Anaglyptus decemmaculatus Gressitt, 1935
- Anaglyptus dolosulus Holzschuh, 2006
- Anaglyptus elegantulus Miroshnikov, Bi & Lin, 2014
- Anaglyptus fasciatus Thomson, 1857
- Anaglyptus flavus Viktora, Tichý & Rapuzzi, 2013
- Anaglyptus ganglbaueri Reitter, 1886
- Anaglyptus gibbosus (Fabricius, 1787)
- Anaglyptus graphellus Holzschuh, 2011
- Anaglyptus gressitti Holzschuh, 1999
- Anaglyptus higashiyamai Makihara & Hayashi, 1987
- Anaglyptus hilari Castelnau & Gory, 1841
- Anaglyptus humerosus Chevrolat, 1863
- Anaglyptus isolatus Gressitt, 1951
- Anaglyptus kabakovi Miroshnikov, 2015
- Anaglyptus kanssuensis Ganglbauer, 1889
- Anaglyptus kontumensis Viktora, 2019
- Anaglyptus lizhigangi Bi & Niisato, 2018
- Anaglyptus longispinis (Gardner, 1939)
- Anaglyptus luteofasciatus Pic, 1905
- Anaglyptus malickyi Holzschuh, 1991
- Anaglyptus marmoratus (Holzschuh, 1982)
- Anaglyptus matsushitai Hayashi, 1955
- Anaglyptus meridionalis Matsushita, 1933
- Anaglyptus miroshnikovi Tichý & Lin, 2021
- Anaglyptus mysticoides Reitter, 1894
- Anaglyptus mysticus (Linné, 1758)
- Anaglyptus niponensis Bates, 1884
- Anaglyptus nokasanus Kano, 1930
- Anaglyptus petrae Viktora & Liu, 2018
- Anaglyptus praecellens Holzschuh, 1981
- Anaglyptus producticollis Gressitt, 1951
- Anaglyptus qijuni Viktora & Liu, 2018
- Anaglyptus residuus Holzschuh, 2010
- Anaglyptus rufobasalis Tippmann, 1955
- Anaglyptus rufogriseus (Pic, 1928)
- Anaglyptus sericellus Holzschuh & Lin, 2015
- Anaglyptus simplicicornis Reitter, 1906
- Anaglyptus subfasciatus Pic, 1906
- Anaglyptus tersus Viktora & Tichý, 2015
- Anaglyptus tichyi Miroshnikov, Bi & Lin, 2014
- Anaglyptus trocolii Miroshnikov, 2015
- Anaglyptus ulmiphilus (Holzschuh, 1982)
- Anaglyptus vicinulus Holzschuh, 1999
- Anaglyptus watsoni (Gahan, 1906)
- Anaglyptus yakushimanus Hayashi, 1968
- Anaglyptus zappii Rapuzzi & Sama, 2014
