= Tilloclytus minutus =

Scientific classification
- Domain: Eukaryota
- Kingdom: Animalia
- Phylum: Arthropoda
- Class: Insecta
- Order: Coleoptera
- Suborder: Polyphaga
- Infraorder: Cucujiformia
- Family: Cerambycidae
- Genus: Tilloclytus
- Species: T. minutus

Binomial name
- Tilloclytus minutus Fisher, 1932

Synonyms
- Tilloclytus puertoricensis Fisher 1935

Species of beetle

Tilloclytus minutus is a species of longhorn beetle in the Cerambycinae subfamily. It was described by Fisher in 1932. It is known from Puerto Rico.
