= Tilloclytus =

Scientific classification
- Kingdom: Animalia
- Phylum: Arthropoda
- Clade: Pancrustacea
- Class: Insecta
- Order: Coleoptera
- Suborder: Polyphaga
- Infraorder: Cucujiformia
- Family: Cerambycidae
- Tribe: Anaglyptini
- Genus: Tilloclytus

Genus of beetles

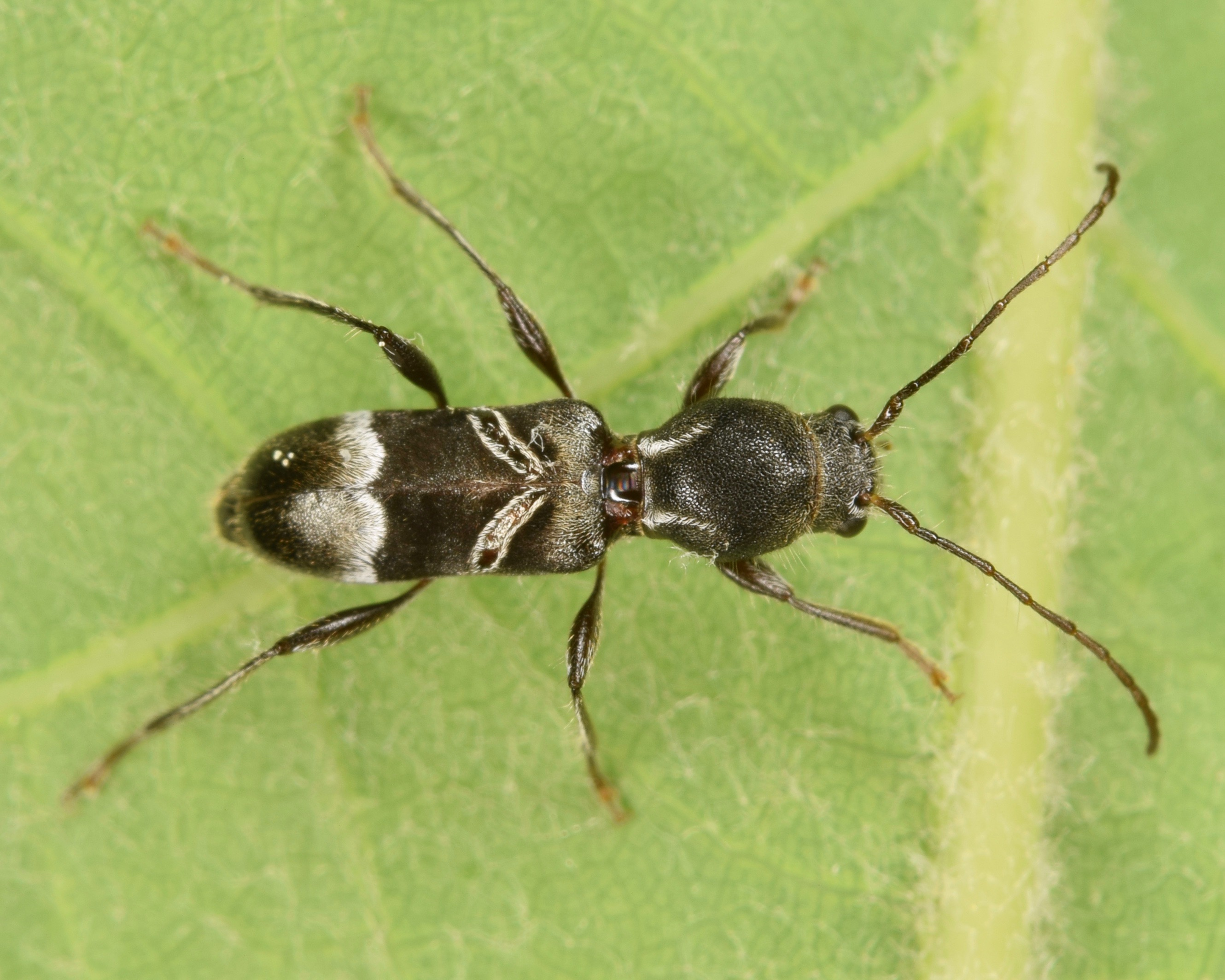
Tilloclytus geminatus

Tilloclytus is a genus of beetles in the family Cerambycidae, containing the following species:

- Tilloclytus balteatus (Chevrolat, 1860)
- Tilloclytus baoruco Lingafelter, 2011
- Tilloclytus bruneri Fisher, 1932
- Tilloclytus clavipes Bates, 1885
- Tilloclytus cleroides (White, 1855)
- Tilloclytus conradti Bates, 1892
- Tilloclytus cubae Fisher, 1932
- Tilloclytus geminatus (Haldeman, 1847)
- Tilloclytus haematocephalus (Chevrolat, 1862)
- Tilloclytus minutus Fisher, 1932
- Tilloclytus neiba Lingafelter, 2011
- Tilloclytus nivicinctus (Chevrolat, 1862)
- Tilloclytus pilosus Zayas, 1975
- Tilloclytus rufipes Fisher, 1942
