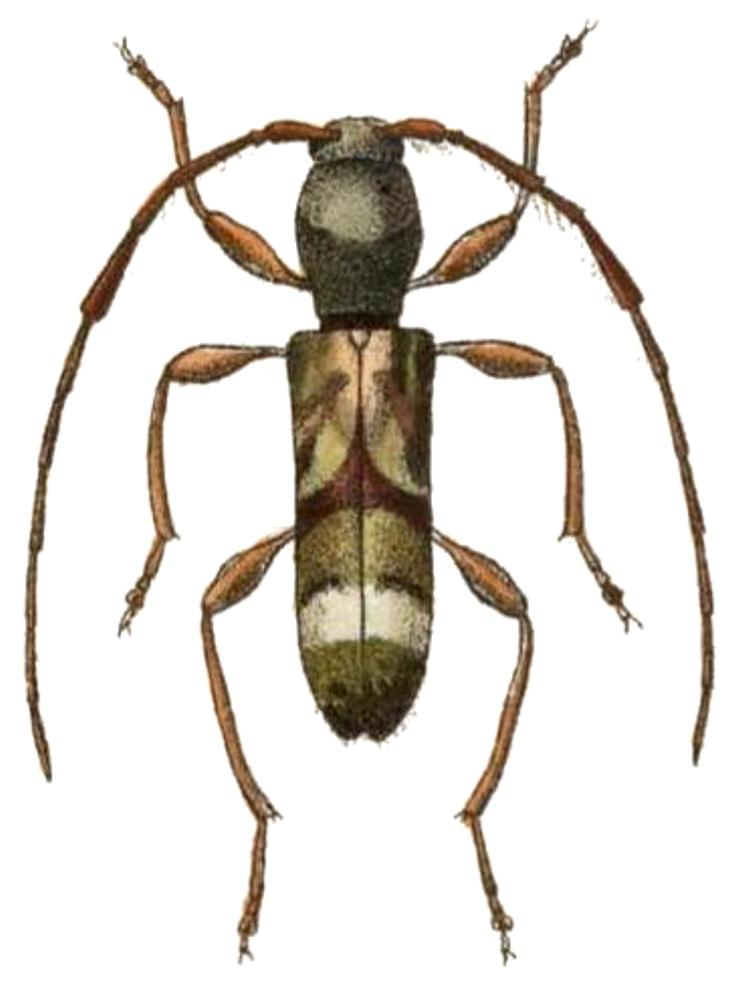

Scientific classification
- Domain: Eukaryota
- Kingdom: Animalia
- Phylum: Arthropoda
- Class: Insecta
- Order: Coleoptera
- Suborder: Polyphaga
- Infraorder: Cucujiformia
- Family: Cerambycidae
- Tribe: Anaglyptini
- Genus: Pempteurys
- Species: P. sericans

Binomial name
- Pempteurys sericans Bates, 1885

= Pempteurys =

Pempteurys sericans

Genus of beetles

Pempteurys sericans is a species of beetle in the family Cerambycidae, the only species in the genus Pempteurys.
