= Microclytus compressicollis =

Scientific classification
- Domain: Eukaryota
- Kingdom: Animalia
- Phylum: Arthropoda
- Class: Insecta
- Order: Coleoptera
- Suborder: Polyphaga
- Infraorder: Cucujiformia
- Family: Cerambycidae
- Genus: Microclytus
- Species: M. compressicollis

Binomial name
- Microclytus compressicollis (Laporte & Gory, 1835)

Synonyms
- Microclytus compressicornis Leng 1918; Microclytus frosti Casey 1912; Microclytus gazellula Horn 1884; Microclytus gibbulus LeConte 1850; Microclytus insinuans Casey 1893; Microclytus niger LeConte 1850

Species of beetle

Microclytus compressicollis is a species of longhorn beetle in the Cerambycinae subfamily. It was described by Laporte and Gory in 1835. It is known from northeastern North America.
