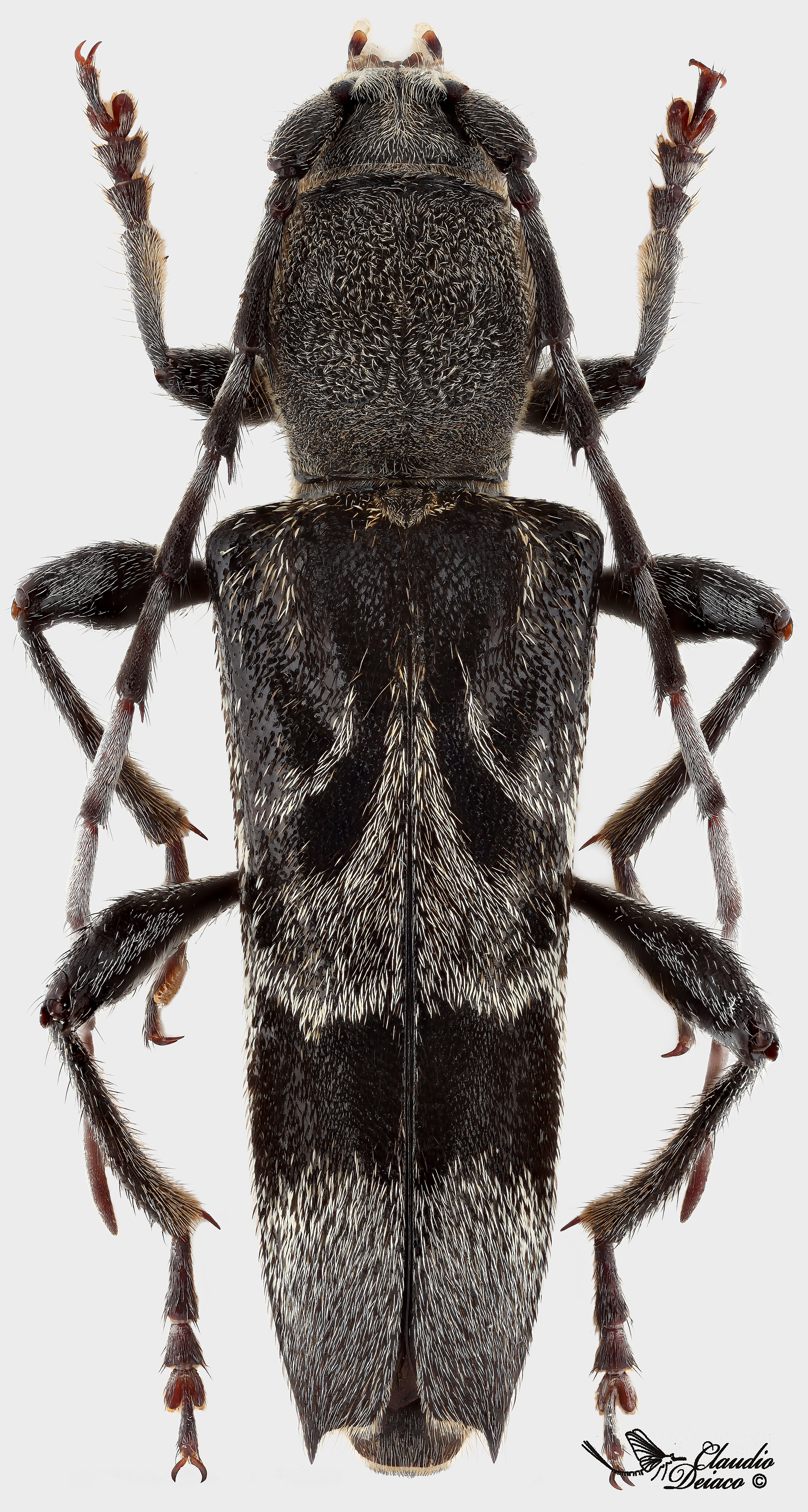

Scientific classification
- Kingdom: Animalia
- Phylum: Arthropoda
- Clade: Pancrustacea
- Class: Insecta
- Order: Coleoptera
- Suborder: Polyphaga
- Infraorder: Cucujiformia
- Family: Cerambycidae
- Genus: Anaglyptus
- Species: A. gibbosus

Binomial name
- Anaglyptus gibbosus (Fabricius, 1787)

= Anaglyptus gibbosus =

Species of beetle

Anaglyptus gibbosus is a beetle in the family Cerambycidae. The scientific name of this species was first published in 1787 by Fabricius. This species resides on broad-leafed trees in Southern Europe (Spain, France, Italy, Slovenia, Croatia) and North Africa (Tunisia, Algeria). Its larvae live in dry wood and adults will emerge from flowers between April and June.
