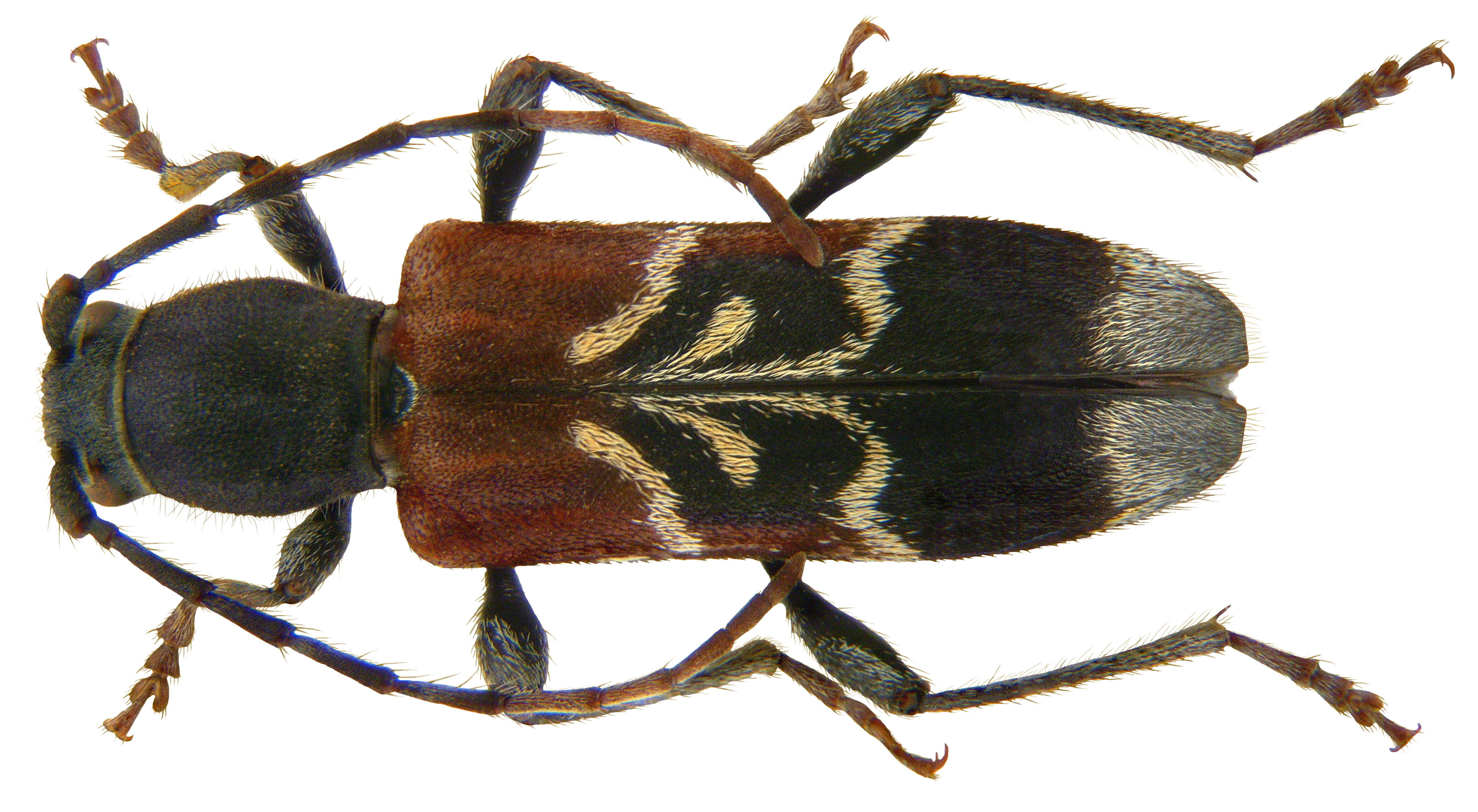
- Anaglyptus mysticus (Linné, 1758) female (3296101992).

Scientific classification
- Domain: Eukaryota
- Kingdom: Animalia
- Phylum: Arthropoda
- Class: Insecta
- Order: Coleoptera
- Suborder: Polyphaga
- Infraorder: Cucujiformia
- Family: Cerambycidae
- Subfamily: Cerambycinae
- Tribe: Anaglyptini

= Anaglyptini =

Tribe of beetles

Anaglyptini is a tribe of beetles in the subfamily Cerambycinae, containing the following genera:

- Anaglyptus
- Aphysotes
- Clytoderus
- Cyrtophorus
- Diphyrama
- Hirticlytus
- Microclytus
- Oligoenoplus
- Paraclytus
- Pempteurys
- Tilloclytus
- Yoshiakioclytus
