= Tilloclytus cleroides =

Scientific classification
- Domain: Eukaryota
- Kingdom: Animalia
- Phylum: Arthropoda
- Class: Insecta
- Order: Coleoptera
- Suborder: Polyphaga
- Infraorder: Cucujiformia
- Family: Cerambycidae
- Genus: Tilloclytus
- Species: T. cleroides

Binomial name
- Tilloclytus cleroides (White, 1855)

Species of beetle

Tilloclytus cleroides is a species of longhorn beetle in the Cerambycinae subfamily. White described it in 1855. It is known from Colombia and Venezuela.
