= Tilloclytus clavipes =

Scientific classification
- Domain: Eukaryota
- Kingdom: Animalia
- Phylum: Arthropoda
- Class: Insecta
- Order: Coleoptera
- Suborder: Polyphaga
- Infraorder: Cucujiformia
- Family: Cerambycidae
- Genus: Tilloclytus
- Species: T. clavipes

Binomial name
- Tilloclytus clavipes Bates, 1885

Species of beetle

Tilloclytus clavipes is a species of longhorn beetle in the Cerambycinae subfamily. It was described by Henry Walter Bates in 1885. It is known from Guatemala.
