= Eutrichillus brevipilus =

Scientific classification
- Domain: Eukaryota
- Kingdom: Animalia
- Phylum: Arthropoda
- Class: Insecta
- Order: Coleoptera
- Suborder: Polyphaga
- Infraorder: Cucujiformia
- Family: Cerambycidae
- Genus: Eutrichillus
- Species: E. brevipilus

Binomial name
- Eutrichillus brevipilus Chemsak & Linsley, 1986

Species of beetle

Eutrichillus brevipilus is a species of longhorn beetles of the subfamily Lamiinae. It was described by Chemsak and Linsley in 1986, and is known from northwestern Mexico.
