= Microclytus =

Scientific classification
- Domain: Eukaryota
- Kingdom: Animalia
- Phylum: Arthropoda
- Class: Insecta
- Order: Coleoptera
- Suborder: Polyphaga
- Infraorder: Cucujiformia
- Family: Cerambycidae
- Tribe: Anaglyptini
- Genus: Microclytus

Genus of insects

Microclytus is a genus of beetles in the family Cerambycidae, containing the following species:

- Microclytus compressicollis (Laporte & Gory, 1835)
- Microclytus gazellula (Haldeman, 1847)
