= Tilloclytus haematocephalus =

Scientific classification
- Domain: Eukaryota
- Kingdom: Animalia
- Phylum: Arthropoda
- Class: Insecta
- Order: Coleoptera
- Suborder: Polyphaga
- Infraorder: Cucujiformia
- Family: Cerambycidae
- Genus: Tilloclytus
- Species: T. haematocephalus

Binomial name
- Tilloclytus haematocephalus (Chevrolat, 1862)

Species of beetle

Tilloclytus haematocephalus is a species of longhorn beetle in the Cerambycinae subfamily. It was described by Chevrolat in 1862. It is known from eastern Mexico.
