= Microclytus gazellula =

Scientific classification
- Domain: Eukaryota
- Kingdom: Animalia
- Phylum: Arthropoda
- Class: Insecta
- Order: Coleoptera
- Suborder: Polyphaga
- Infraorder: Cucujiformia
- Family: Cerambycidae
- Genus: Microclytus
- Species: M. gazellula

Binomial name
- Microclytus gazellula (Haldeman, 1847)

Species of beetle

Microclytus gazellula is a species of longhorn beetle in the Cerambycinae subfamily. It was described by Haldeman in 1847. It is known from northeastern North America.
