= Clytoderus =

Clytoderus pygmaeus

Scientific classification
- Domain: Eukaryota
- Kingdom: Animalia
- Phylum: Arthropoda
- Class: Insecta
- Order: Coleoptera
- Suborder: Polyphaga
- Infraorder: Cucujiformia
- Family: Cerambycidae
- Tribe: Anaglyptini
- Genus: Clytoderus
- Species: C. pygmaeus

Binomial name
- Clytoderus pygmaeus Linsley, 1935

Genus of insects

Clytoderus pygmaeus is a species of beetle in the family Cerambycidae, the only species in the genus Clytoderus.
