= Tilloclytus bruneri =

Scientific classification
- Kingdom: Animalia
- Phylum: Arthropoda
- Clade: Pancrustacea
- Class: Insecta
- Order: Coleoptera
- Suborder: Polyphaga
- Infraorder: Cucujiformia
- Family: Cerambycidae
- Genus: Tilloclytus
- Species: T. bruneri

Binomial name
- Tilloclytus bruneri Fisher, 1932

Species of beetle

Tilloclytus bruneri is a species of longhorn beetle in the Cerambycinae subfamily. It was described by Fisher in 1932. It is known from Cuba.
