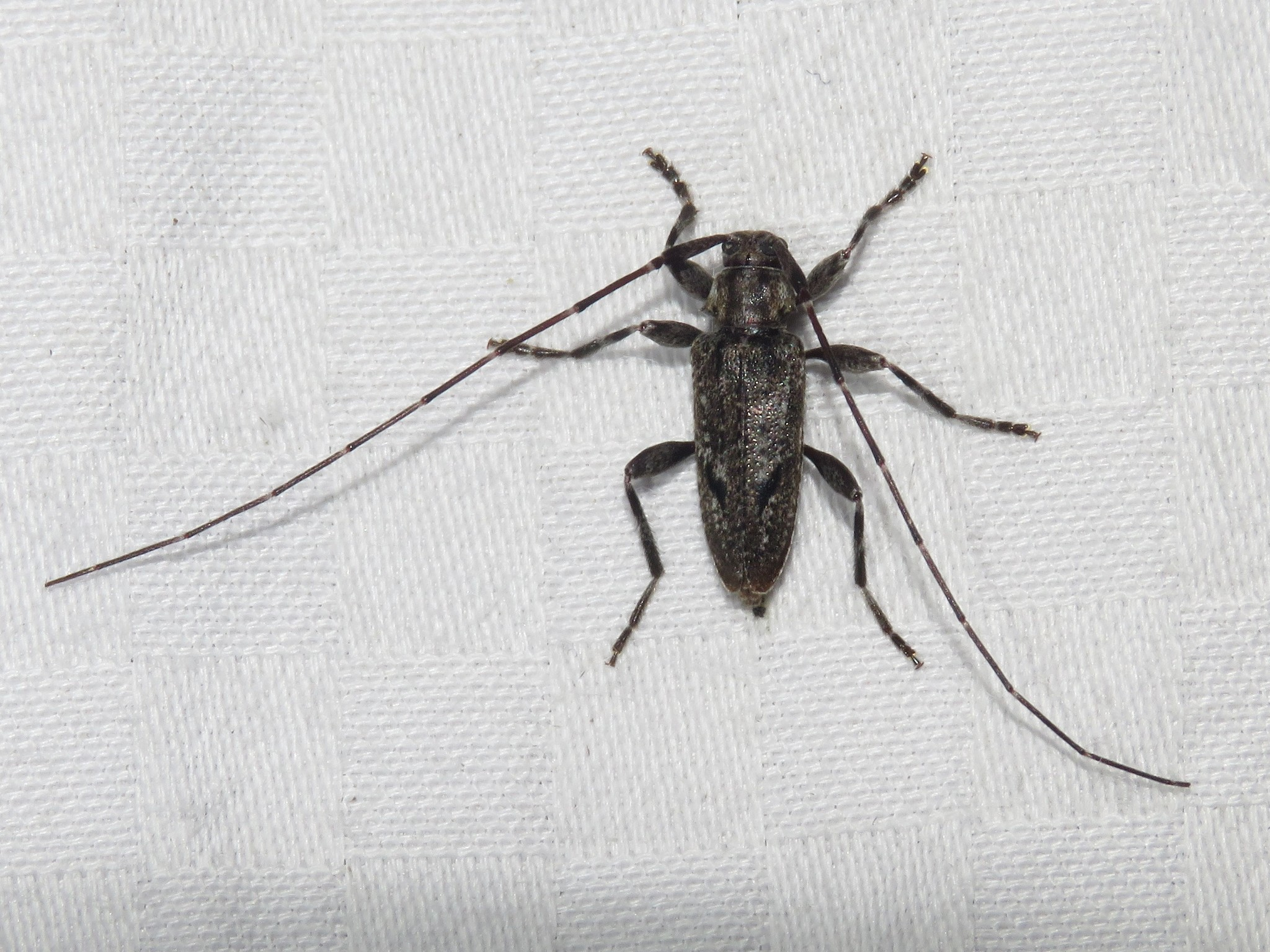

Scientific classification
- Domain: Eukaryota
- Kingdom: Animalia
- Phylum: Arthropoda
- Class: Insecta
- Order: Coleoptera
- Suborder: Polyphaga
- Infraorder: Cucujiformia
- Family: Cerambycidae
- Genus: Eutrichillus
- Species: E. biguttatus

Binomial name
- Eutrichillus biguttatus (LeConte, 1852)

= Eutrichillus biguttatus =

Species of beetle

Eutrichillus biguttatus is a species of longhorn beetle of the subfamily Lamiinae. It was described by John Lawrence LeConte in 1852.
