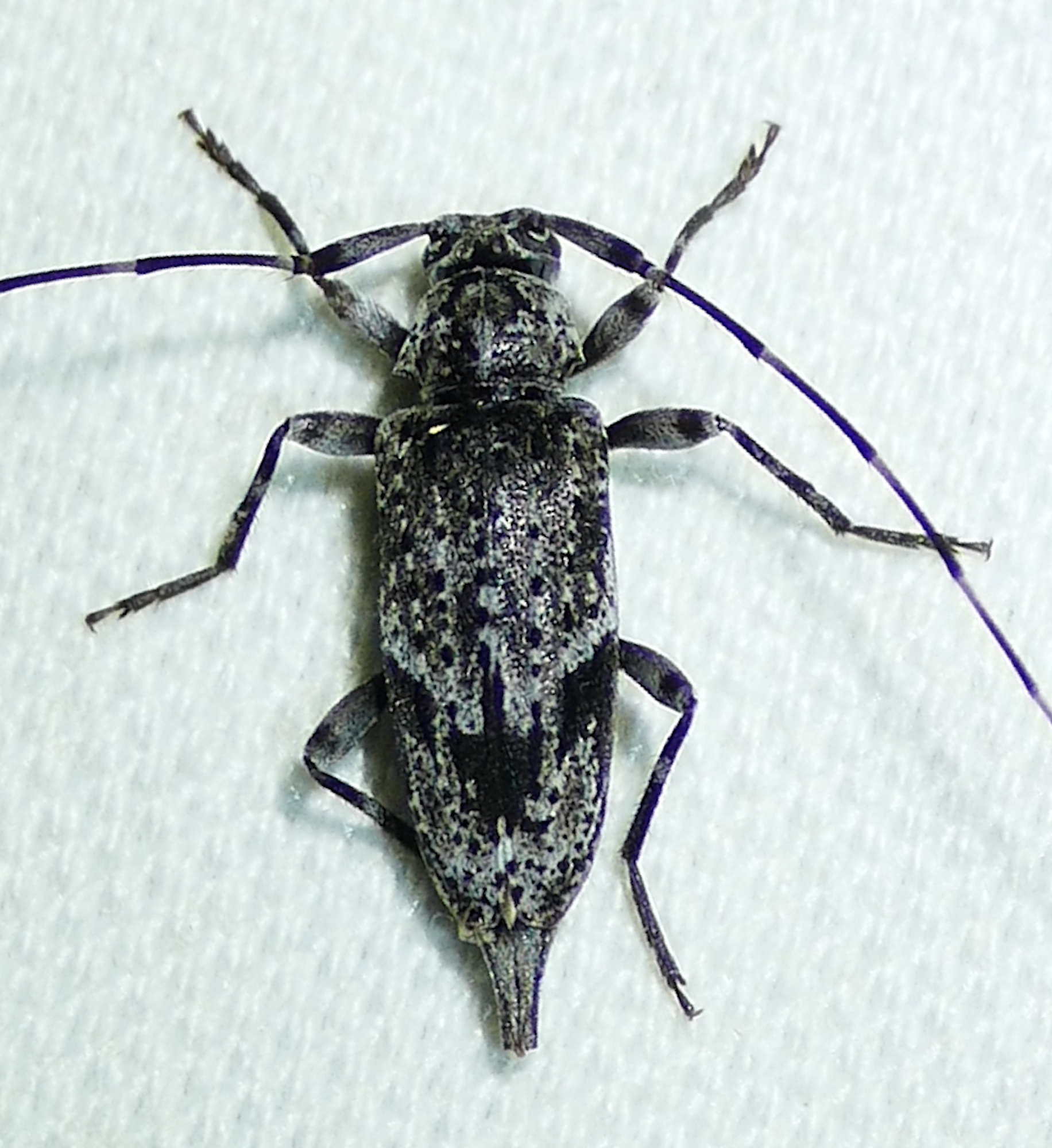

Scientific classification
- Domain: Eukaryota
- Kingdom: Animalia
- Phylum: Arthropoda
- Class: Insecta
- Order: Coleoptera
- Suborder: Polyphaga
- Infraorder: Cucujiformia
- Family: Cerambycidae
- Genus: Eutrichillus
- Species: E. neomexicanus

Binomial name
- Eutrichillus neomexicanus (Champlain & Knull, 1925)

= Eutrichillus neomexicanus =

Species of beetle

Eutrichillus neomexicanus is a species of longhorn beetles of the subfamily Lamiinae. It was described by Champlain and Knull in 1925.
