= Tilloclytus rufipes =

Scientific classification
- Kingdom: Animalia
- Phylum: Arthropoda
- Clade: Pancrustacea
- Class: Insecta
- Order: Coleoptera
- Suborder: Polyphaga
- Infraorder: Cucujiformia
- Family: Cerambycidae
- Genus: Tilloclytus
- Species: T. rufipes

Binomial name
- Tilloclytus rufipes Fisher, 1942

Synonyms
- Tilloclytus elongatus Zayas, 1975

Species of beetle

Tilloclytus rufipes is a species of longhorn beetle in the Cerambycinae subfamily. It was described by Fisher in 1942. It is known from Cuba.
