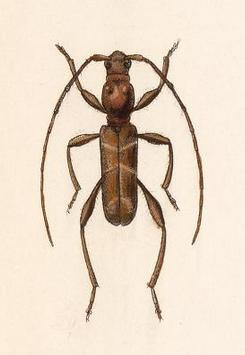

Scientific classification
- Domain: Eukaryota
- Kingdom: Animalia
- Phylum: Arthropoda
- Class: Insecta
- Order: Coleoptera
- Suborder: Polyphaga
- Infraorder: Cucujiformia
- Family: Cerambycidae
- Tribe: Anaglyptini
- Genus: Aphysotes
- Species: A. tubericollis

Binomial name
- Aphysotes tubericollis Bates, 1885

= Aphysotes =

Aphysotes tubericollis

Genus of insects

Aphysotes tubericollis is a species of beetle in the family Cerambycidae, the only species in the genus Aphysotes.
