= Tilloclytus baoruco =

Scientific classification
- Domain: Eukaryota
- Kingdom: Animalia
- Phylum: Arthropoda
- Class: Insecta
- Order: Coleoptera
- Suborder: Polyphaga
- Infraorder: Cucujiformia
- Family: Cerambycidae
- Genus: Tilloclytus
- Species: T. baoruco

Binomial name
- Tilloclytus baoruco Lingafelter, 2011

Species of beetle

Tilloclytus baoruco is a species of longhorn beetle in the Cerambycinae subfamily. It was described by Lingafelter in 2011. It is known from the Dominican Republic.
