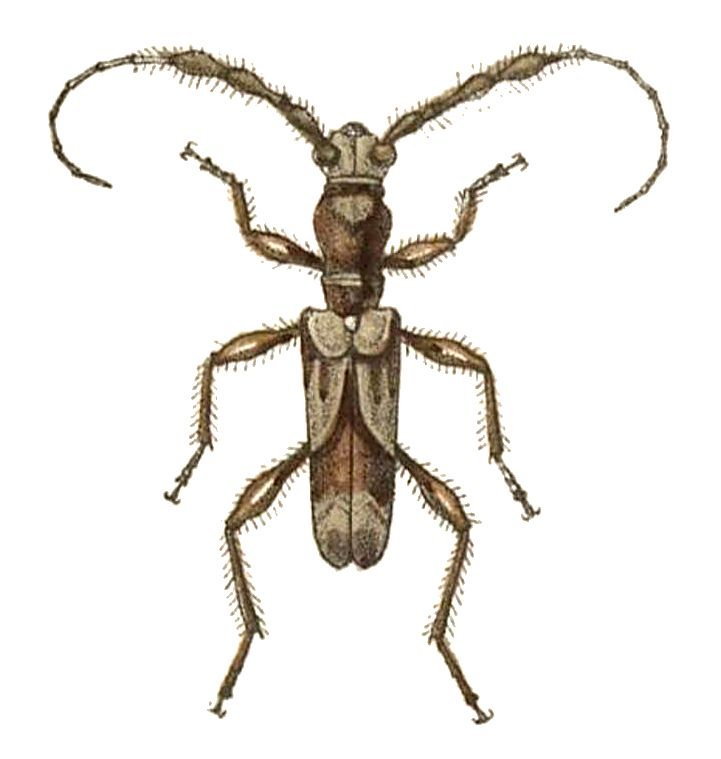

Scientific classification
- Domain: Eukaryota
- Kingdom: Animalia
- Phylum: Arthropoda
- Class: Insecta
- Order: Coleoptera
- Suborder: Polyphaga
- Infraorder: Cucujiformia
- Family: Cerambycidae
- Tribe: Anaglyptini
- Genus: Diphyrama
- Species: D. singularis

Binomial name
- Diphyrama singularis Bates, 1872

= Diphyrama =

Diphyrama singularis

Genus of insects

Diphyrama singularis is a species of beetle in the family Cerambycidae, the only species in the genus Diphyrama.
