= Tilloclytus balteatus =

Scientific classification
- Domain: Eukaryota
- Kingdom: Animalia
- Phylum: Arthropoda
- Class: Insecta
- Order: Coleoptera
- Suborder: Polyphaga
- Infraorder: Cucujiformia
- Family: Cerambycidae
- Genus: Tilloclytus
- Species: T. balteatus

Binomial name
- Tilloclytus balteatus (Chevrolat, 1860)

Species of beetle

Tilloclytus balteatus is a species of longhorn beetle in the Cerambycinae subfamily. It was described by Chevrolat in 1860. It is known from eastern Mexico, Honduras, and Costa Rica.
