= Coatonachthodes ovambolandicus =

Scientific classification
- Kingdom: Animalia
- Phylum: Arthropoda
- Class: Insecta
- Order: Coleoptera
- Suborder: Polyphaga
- Infraorder: Staphyliniformia
- Family: Staphylinidae
- Genus: Coatonachthodes
- Species: C. ovambolandicus

Binomial name
- Coatonachthodes ovambolandicus Kistner, 1968

Species of beetle

Coatonachthodes ovambolandicus is a termite-mimicking beetle which lives as a parasite in their nests. It looks roughly like a termite from above, though its legs look like "twisted balloons" rather than real insect legs. This less than accurate emulation can be explained by looking at the beetle from the side rather than down at its dorsum. The beetle's head and leg-bearing thorax are minuscule relative to its large abdomen. This part of the body is bent back towards the anterior (head) end, covering the rest of its body. It is the abdomen alone which is visible from above, providing a deceptive 'umbrella' that looks like a termite. The rear end thus acts as the termite 'head', and its appendages (legs and antennae) are composed of moving flaps attached to the abdomen's upper side.

The genus is named after the collector of the specimen W. G. H. Coaton.

Although the mimicry is not as convincing as that of other mimics, such as the ant mimic Labidus praedator, the evolution of the resemblance is certainly remarkable considering the changes required. In Climbing Mount Improbable, Richard Dawkins describes this imitation as "one of the most astonishing spectacles in all natural history."
