= Eutrichillus pini =

Scientific classification
- Domain: Eukaryota
- Kingdom: Animalia
- Phylum: Arthropoda
- Class: Insecta
- Order: Coleoptera
- Suborder: Polyphaga
- Infraorder: Cucujiformia
- Family: Cerambycidae
- Genus: Eutrichillus
- Species: E. pini

Binomial name
- Eutrichillus pini (Schaeffer, 1905)

Species of beetle

Eutrichillus pini is a species of longhorn beetles of the subfamily Lamiinae. It was described by Schaeffer in 1905.
