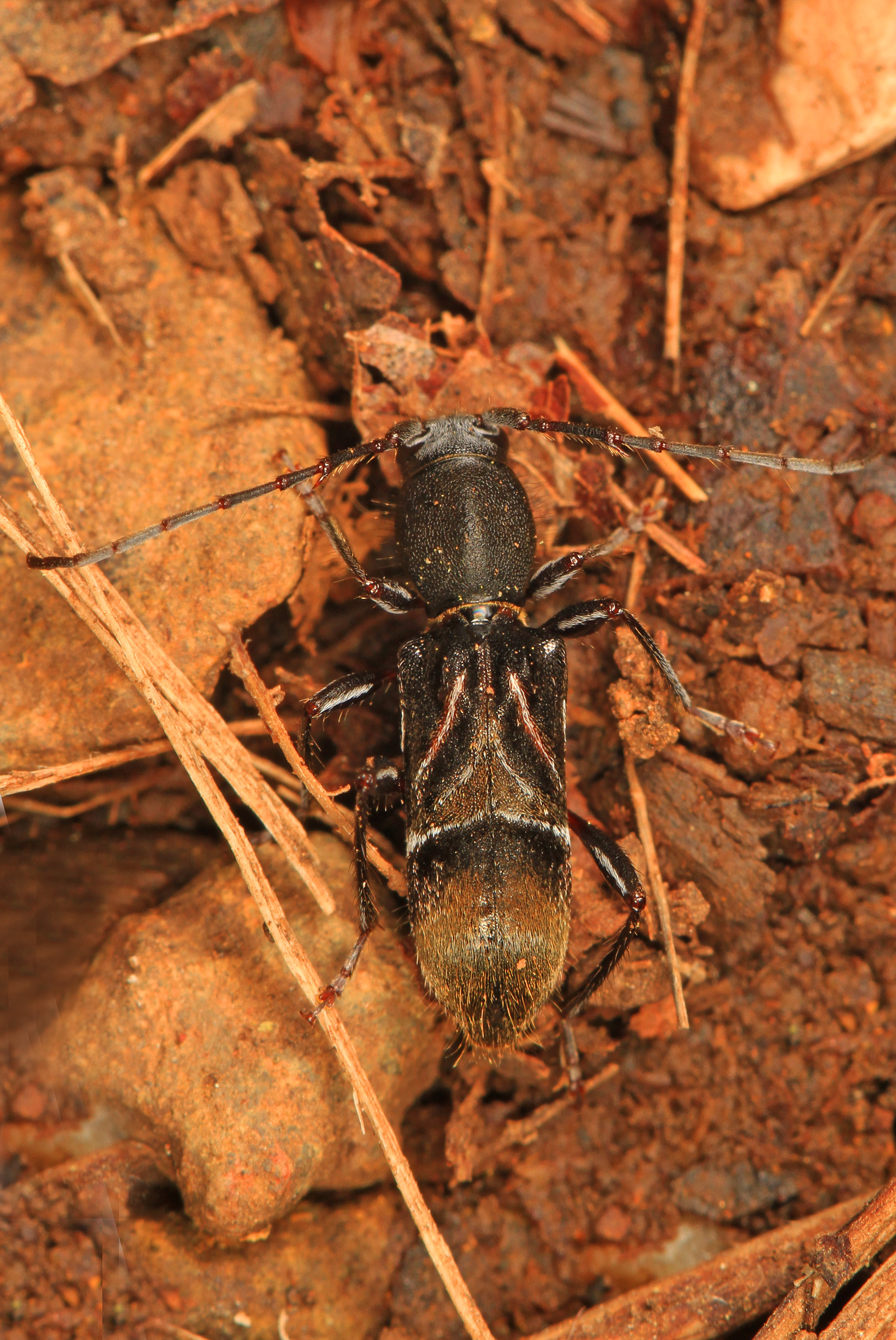

Scientific classification
- Domain: Eukaryota
- Kingdom: Animalia
- Phylum: Arthropoda
- Class: Insecta
- Order: Coleoptera
- Suborder: Polyphaga
- Infraorder: Cucujiformia
- Family: Cerambycidae
- Tribe: Anaglyptini
- Genus: Cyrtophorus
- Species: C. verrucosus

Binomial name
- Cyrtophorus verrucosus (Olivier, 1795)

= Cyrtophorus =

Cyrtophorus verrucosus

Genus of insects

Cyrtophorus is a genus of beetle in the family Cerambycidae. Cyrtophorus verruscosus is the only species in the genus Cyrtophorus.
