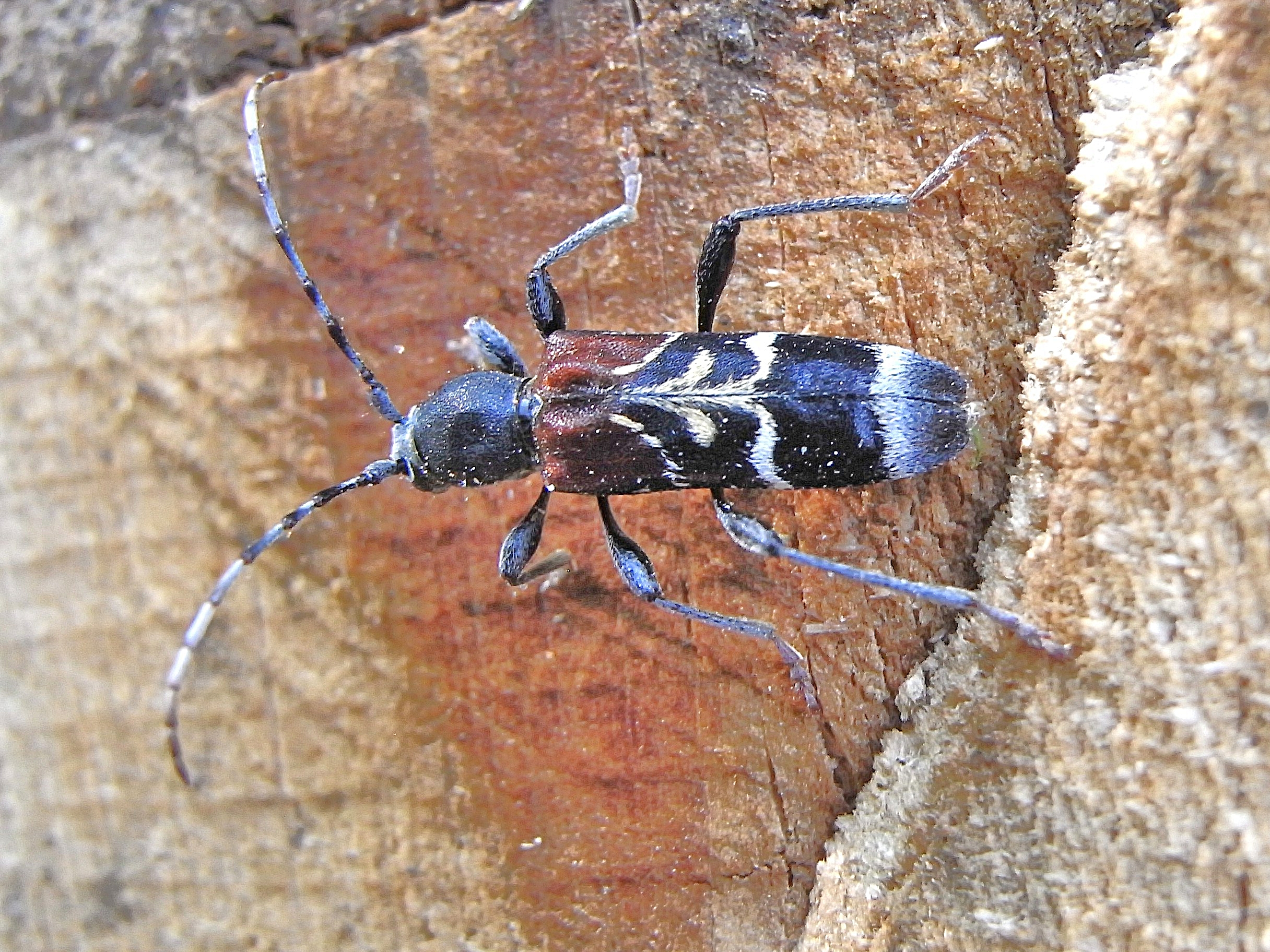

Conservation status
- Least Concern (IUCN 3.1)

Scientific classification
- Kingdom: Animalia
- Phylum: Arthropoda
- Class: Insecta
- Order: Coleoptera
- Suborder: Polyphaga
- Infraorder: Cucujiformia
- Family: Cerambycidae
- Genus: Anaglyptus
- Species: A. mysticus

Binomial name
- Anaglyptus mysticus (Linnaeus, 1758)

Synonyms
- Anaglyptus mysticus var. tripartitus (Plavilstshikov); Callidium mysticum (Plavilstshikov); Cerambyx quadricolor (Scopoli, 1763); Clytus mysticus (Linnaeus - Boheman, 1850); Leptura mystica (Linnaeus, 1758); Stenocorus germaniae (Voet, 1806)

= Anaglyptus mysticus =

Species of beetle

Anaglyptus mysticus, the rufous-shouldered longhorn beetle, is a species of beetle belonging to the family Cerambycidae, subfamily Cerambycinae.

This beetle is present in most of Europe, in Turkey and in North Africa.

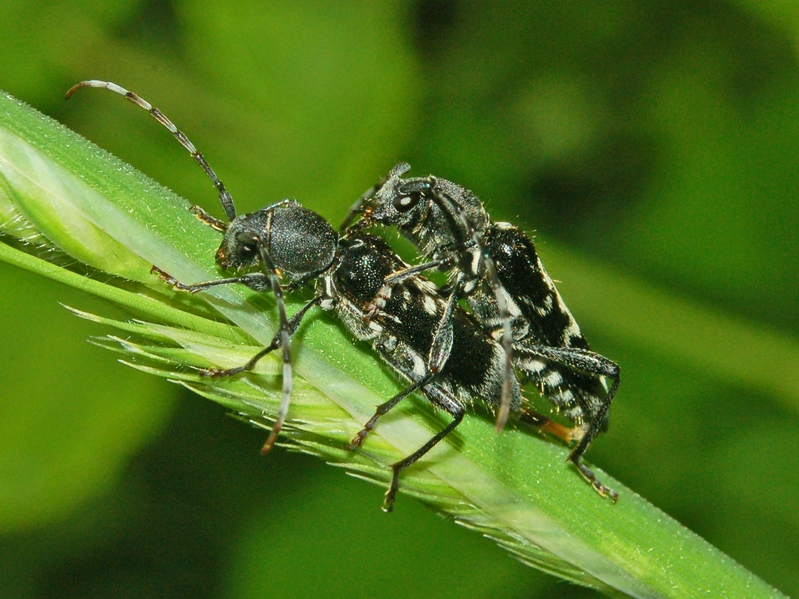
A. mysticus albofasciatus, mating pair

The adults grow up to 8–15 millimetres (0.31–0.59 in) and can be encountered from April through July, completing their life cycle in two years, as the beetles overwinter.

The head and pronotum are black, while the elytra are reddish-brown at the front and blue-gray at the back, with three oblique light stripes in the middle. The body is hairy and has a bluish tone.

A. mysticus on Ranunculus

They are polyphagous in various species of herbaceous plants and deciduous trees, mainly feeding on Corylus avellana, Carpinus betulus, Fagus sylvatica, Acer campestre, Sambucus racemosa, as well as on Alnus, Crataegus, Rosa, Quercus species. Adults usually are found on flowers, while the larvae develop in dead branches and stumps of trees.
