= Sonnet to Science =

1829 poem by Edgar Allan Poe

"Sonnet to Science" (originally "Sonnet — To Science") is an 1829 poem by Edgar Allan Poe, published in Al Aaraaf, Tamerlane, and Minor Poems.

== Summary ==
Poe asks why science preys on the poet. Science is peering, destructive and interested only in cold realities. It will not allow the poet to soar in fantasy or even to sit peacefully dreaming beneath a tree.

== Publication history ==
In mid-November 1829, Poe agreed with the Baltimore firm Hatch and Dunning to publish his second volume of poetry, entitled Al Aaraaf, Tamerlane, and Minor Poems. This volume was the first instance in which Poe published his verse under his own name as opposed to his first publication, Tamerlane and Other Poems, which was only attributed to “a Bostonian”.

A later published version of this poem includes the following note, “Private reasons—some of which have reference to the sin of plagiarism, and other to the date of Tennyson’s first poems—have induced me, after some hesitation, to re-publish these, the crude compositions of my earliest boyhood. They are printed verbatim—without alteration from the original edition—the date of which is too remote to be judiciously acknowledged.”
