= Richard Dawkins bibliography =

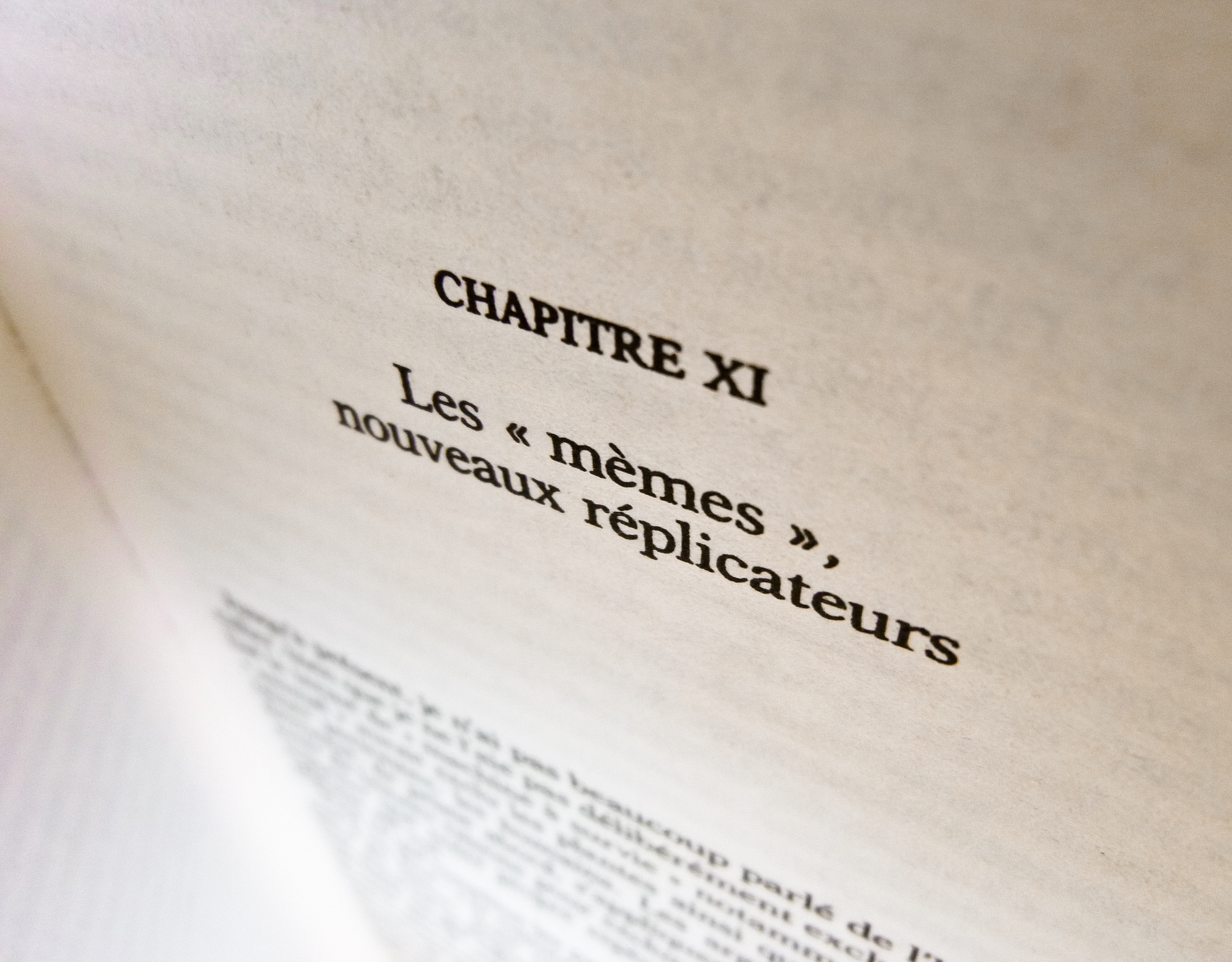
French translation of The Selfish Gene (chapter 11: "Memes: the new replicators")

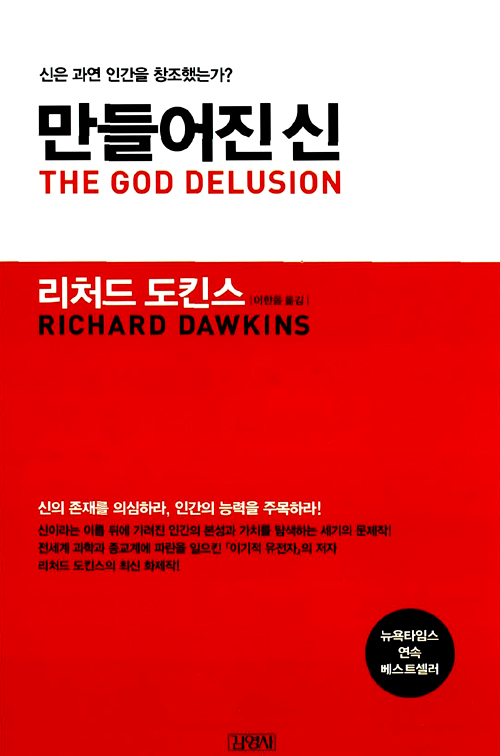
Korean translation of The God Delusion

The following list of publications by Richard Dawkins is a chronological list of papers, articles, essays and books published by British ethologist and evolutionary biologist Richard Dawkins.

He has also written many book reviews and newspaper articles which are not listed on this page.

== Books ==
- The Selfish Gene. 1976.
- The Extended Phenotype. 1982.
- The Blind Watchmaker. 1986.
- River Out of Eden. 1995.
- Climbing Mount Improbable. 1996.
- Unweaving the Rainbow. 1998.
- A Devil's Chaplain. 2003.
- The Ancestor's Tale. 2004.
- The God Delusion. 2006.
- The Oxford Book of Modern Science Writing. 2008.
- The Greatest Show on Earth: The Evidence for Evolution. 2009.
- The Magic of Reality: How We Know What's Really True. 2011.
- An Appetite for Wonder. 2013.
- Brief Candle in the Dark. 2015.
- Science in the Soul. 2017.
- Outgrowing God. 2019.
- Books Do Furnish a Life. 2021.
- Flights of Fancy: Defying Gravity by Design and Evolution. 2021.
- The Genetic Book of the Dead. 2024.
- 42 Tales from Life: A Modern Bestiary. 2026.

== Popular articles ==
- Dawkins, R. (January 1982). "The myth of genetic determinism". New Scientist: 27–30.
- Dawkins, R. (September 1986). "Creation and Natural Selection". New Scientist: 34–38.
- Dawkins, R. (June 1992). "Lions 10, Christians Nil". New Humanist. 107: 2–3.
- Dawkins, R. (December 1992). "Is god a computer virus?". New Statesman. 5 (233): 42–45.
- Dawkins, R. (June 1993). "Meet my cousin, the chimpanzee". New Scientist. 138 (1876): 36–38.
- Dawkins, R. (1993). "The 'Awe' Factor". Skeptical Inquirer. 17: 242–243.
- Dawkins, R. (1993). "Viruses of the Mind" (PDF). Free Inquiry: 34–41.
- Dawkins, R. (September 1995). "The Evolved Imagination". Natural History. 104 (9): 8.
- Dawkins, R. (1995). "Putting Away Childish Things". Skeptical Inquirer. 19: 31–36.
- Dawkins, R. (November 1995). "God's Utility Function". Scientific American. 273 (5): 80–85. Bibcode:1995SciAm.273e..80D. doi:10.1038/scientificamerican1195-80.
- Dawkins, R. (1995-12-30). "The real romance in the stars". Independent.
- Dawkins, R. (10 April 1999). "Snake Oil and Holy Water". Forbes: 235+.
- Dawkins, R. (2 October 2000). "Hall of Mirrors". Forbes: 273.
- Dawkins, R. (January 2001). "What is science good for?". Harvard Business Review. 79 (1): 159–63, 178. PMID 11189460.
- Dawkins, R. (2004-09-11). "Gerin Oil". Free Inquiry. Archived from the original on 2011-07-25.
- Dawkins, R. (2005-02-19). "The Giant Tortoise's Tale". The Guardian.
- Dawkins, R. (2005-02-26). "The Turtle's Tale". The Guardian (London).
- Dawkins, R. (2005-05-21). "God's Gift to Kansas". The Times (London).
- Dawkins, R. "The Lava Lizard's Tale". The Guardian.
- Dawkins, R.; Dawkins, R; Noble, D; Yudkin, M (2007). "Genes still central". New Scientist. 196 (2634): 18. doi:10.1016/S0262-4079(07)63136-4.
- Krauss, L.M.; Dawkins, R. (2007). "Should science speak to faith?". Scientific American. 297 (1): 88–91. Bibcode:2007SciAm.297a..88K. doi:10.1038/scientificamerican0707-88 (inactive 12 July 2025). PMID 17695847.
- Dawkins, R. (2008). "The group delusion". New Scientist. 197 (2638): 17. doi:10.1016/S0262-4079(08)60086-X.
- Dawkins, R. (2008). "The evolution of altruism – what matters is gene selection". New Scientist. 197 (2638): 17. doi:10.1016/S0262-4079(08)60086-X.

== Academic papers ==
=== 1960s ===
- Dawkins, R. (1968). "The ontogeny of a pecking preference in domestic chicks". Zeitschrift für Tierpsychologie. 25 (2): 170–186. doi:10.1111/j.1439-0310.1968.tb00011.x. PMID 5684149.
- Dawkins, Richard (1969). "A threshold model of choice behaviour". Animal Behaviour. 17: 120–133. doi:10.1016/0003-3472(69)90120-1. ISSN 0003-3472.
- Dawkins, Richard (1969). "The attention threshold model". Animal Behaviour. 17: 134–141. doi:10.1016/0003-3472(69)90121-3. ISSN 0003-3472.
- Dawkins, R. (1969). "Bees Are Easily Distracted". Science. 165 (3895): 751. Bibcode:1969Sci...165..751D. doi:10.1126/science.165.3895.751. PMID 17742255.
- Dawkins, Richard; Impekoven, Monica (1969). "The 'peck/no-peck decision-maker' in the black-headed gull chick". Animal Behaviour. 17: 243–251. doi:10.1016/0003-3472(69)90009-8. ISSN 0003-3472.

=== 1970s ===
- Smith, James N.M.; Dawkins, Richard (1971). "The hunting behaviour of individual great tits in relation to spatial variations in their food density". Animal Behaviour. 19 (4): 695–706. doi:10.1016/s0003-3472(71)80173-2. ISSN 0003-3472.
- Dawkins, R. (1971). "Selective neurone death as a possible memory mechanism". Nature. 229 (5280): 118–119. Bibcode:1971Natur.229..118D. doi:10.1038/229118a0. PMID 4923095. S2CID 30817338.
- Dawkins, Richard (1971). "A Cheap Method of Recording Behavioural Events, for Direct Computer-Access". Behaviour. 40 (1–2): 162–172. doi:10.1163/156853971X00375. ISSN 0005-7959.
- Abel, Bob; Anderson, J. M.; Anderson, H. R.; Bawden, N.; Bell, Graham; Campbell, Ian; Cody, C. J.; Cornwallis, L.; Dawkins, Marian; Dawkins, Richard; Dawson, David; Diamond, A. W.; Douglas-Hamilton, Iain; Dunn, E. K.; Grant, P. (1972). ""Blueprint for Survival"". Nature. 235 (5338): 405. Bibcode:1972Natur.235..405A. doi:10.1038/235405b0. ISSN 1476-4687.
- Dawkins, Richard; Dawkins, Marian (1973). "Decisions and the Uncertainty of Behaviour". Behaviour. 45 (1/2): 83–103. doi:10.1163/156853974X00606. ISSN 0005-7959. JSTOR 4533502.
- Dawkins, R. (1976). "Growing points in ethology". In Bateson, P.P.G.; Hinde, R.A. (eds.). Hierarchical organization: A candidate principle for ethology. Cambridge: Cambridge University Press.
- Dawkins, R.; Carlisle, T.R. (1976). "Parental investment, mate desertion and a fallacy". Nature. 262 (5564): 131–133. Bibcode:1976Natur.262..131D. doi:10.1038/262131a0. S2CID 4278681.
- Treisman, M.; Dawkins, R. (1976). "The "cost of meiosis": is there any?". Journal of Theoretical Biology. 63 (2): 479–484. Bibcode:1976JThBi..63..479T. doi:10.1016/0022-5193(76)90047-3. PMID 1011857.
- Dawkins, R. (1976). "Universal Darwinism". In Bendall, D.S. (ed.). Evolution from Molecules to Men. Cambridge: Cambridge University Press. pp. 403–425.
- Dawkins R (1978). "Replicator selection and the extended phenotype". Zeitschrift für Tierpsychologie. 47 (1): 61–76. doi:10.1111/j.1439-0310.1978.tb01823.x. PMID 696023.
- Dawkins, R.; Krebs, J.R. (1978). "Animal signals: information or manipulation". Behavioural Ecology: An Evolutionary Approach. Oxford: Blackwell Scientific Publications. pp. 282–309.
- Dawkins, R. (1979). "Twelve Misunderstandings of Kin Selection". Zeitschrift für Tierpsychologie. 51 (2): 184–200. doi:10.1111/j.1439-0310.1979.tb00682.x.
- Dawkins, R.; Krebs, J.R. (1979). "Arms races between and within species". Proc. R. Soc. Lond. B. 205 (1161): 489–511. Bibcode:1979RSPSB.205..489D. doi:10.1098/rspb.1979.0081. PMID 42057. S2CID 9695900.
- Brockmann, H.J.; Dawkins, R.; Grafen A. (1979). "Joint nesting in a digger wasp as an evolutionarily stable preadaptation to social life". Behaviour. 71 (3): 203–244. doi:10.1163/156853979X00179.
- Brockmann, H. Jane; Grafen, Alan; Dawkins, Richard (1979). "Evolutionarily stable nesting strategy in a digger wasp". Journal of Theoretical Biology. 77 (4): 473–496. Bibcode:1979JThBi..77..473J. doi:10.1016/0022-5193(79)90021-3. PMID 491692.

=== 1980s ===
- Dawkins, R. (1980). "Good strategy or evolutionarily stable strategy". In Barlow, G.W.; Silverberg, J. (eds.). Sociobiology: Beyond Nature/Nurture?. Colorado: Westview Press. pp. 331–337. ISBN 978-0-89158-960-0.
- Dawkins, Richard; Brockmann, H.J. (1980). "Do digger wasps commit the concorde fallacy?". Animal Behaviour. 28 (3): 892–896. doi:10.1016/S0003-3472(80)80149-7. S2CID 54319297.
- Dawkins, Richard (1981). "Selfish genes in race or politics". Nature. 289 (5798): 528. Bibcode:1981Natur.289..528D. doi:10.1038/289528a0. ISSN 1476-4687.
- Dawkins, Richard (1981). "Genes and culture: an awkward hybrid". Nature. 290 (5804): 345–346. Bibcode:1981Natur.290..345D. doi:10.1038/290345a0. ISSN 1476-4687.
- Dawkins, Richard (1981). "In defence of selfish genes". Philosophy. 56 (218): 556–573. doi:10.1017/S0031819100050580. S2CID 170552110.
- Dawkins, Richard (1982). "Replicators and vehicles". In King's College Sociobiology Group (ed.). Current Problems in Sociobiology. Cambridge: Cambridge University Press. pp. 45–64. ISBN 978-0521285209.
- Dawkins, Richard (1983). "Adaptationism was always predictive and needed no defense". Behavioral and Brain Sciences. 6 (3): 360–361. doi:10.1017/S0140525X00016447. ISSN 0140-525X.
- Krebs, J.R.; Dawkins, R. (1984). "Animal signals: mind-reading and manipulation". In Krebs, J. R.; Davies, N.B. (eds.). Behavioural Ecology: An Evolutionary Approach. Oxford: Blackwell Scientific Publications. pp. 380–402. ISBN 978-0-632-02702-6.
- Dawkins, Richard (1985). "What was all the fuss about?". Nature. 316 (6030): 683–684. Bibcode:1985Natur.316..683D. doi:10.1038/316683a0. ISSN 1476-4687.

=== 1990s ===
- Dawkins, R. (1990). "Parasites, desiderata lists and the paradox of the organism". Parasitology. 100: S63–73. doi:10.1017/s0031182000073029. PMID 2235064. S2CID 40932736.
- Dawkins, R. (June 1991). "Evolution on the Mind". Nature. 351 (6329): 686. Bibcode:1991Natur.351..686D. doi:10.1038/351686c0. S2CID 4244210.
- Hurst, L.D.; Dawkins, R. (May 1992). "Evolutionary Chemistry: Life in a Test Tube". Nature. 357 (6375): 198–199. Bibcode:1992Natur.357..198H. doi:10.1038/357198a0. PMID 1375346. S2CID 4238372.
- Dawkins, Richard (1993), Singer, Peter; Cavalieri, Paola (eds.), "Gaps in the Mind", The Great Ape Project, St. Martin's Griffin, pp. 80–87
- Dawkins, R. (1994). "Evolutionary biology. The eye in a twinkling". Nature. 368 (6473): 690–691. Bibcode:1994Natur.368..690D. doi:10.1038/368690a0. PMID 8152479. S2CID 27085132.
- Dawkins, R. (December 1994). "Burying The Vehicle". Behavioral and Brain Sciences. 17 (4): 616–617. doi:10.1017/S0140525X00036207. S2CID 143378724. Archived from the original on July 15, 2008.
- Goodenough, Oliver R.; Dawkins, Richard (1994). "The 'St Jude' mind virus". Nature. 371 (6492): 23–24. Bibcode:1994Natur.371...23G. doi:10.1038/371023a0. ISSN 1476-4687. PMID 8072522.
- Dawkins, R. (September 1995). "The Evolved Imagination". Natural History. 104 (9): 8.
- Dawkins, Richard (1995). "Reply to Lucy Sullivan". Philosophical Transactions: Biological Sciences. 349 (1328): 219–224. doi:10.1098/rstb.1995.0105. ISSN 0962-8436. JSTOR 56419.
- Dawkins, R.; Holliday, Robin (August 1997). "Religion and Science". BioEssays. 19 (8): 743. doi:10.1002/bies.950190817. S2CID 84150261.
- Dawkins, R. (1997). "The Pope's message on evolution: Obscurantism to the rescue". The Quarterly Review of Biology. 72 (4): 397–399. doi:10.1086/419951. S2CID 84574231.
- Dawkins, Richard (1997). Gould, Stephen Jay (ed.). "Human Chauvinism". Evolution. 51 (3): 1015–1020. doi:10.2307/2411179. ISSN 0014-3820. JSTOR 2411179.
- Dawkins, R. (1998). "Postmodernism Disrobed". Nature. 394 (6689): 141–143. Bibcode:1998Natur.394..141D. doi:10.1038/28089. S2CID 40887987.
- Dawkins, R. (1998). "Arresting evidence". The Sciences. 38 (6): 20–5. doi:10.1002/j.2326-1951.1998.tb03673.x. PMID 11657757.

=== 2000s ===
- Dawkins, R. (2000). "W. D. Hamilton memorial". Nature. 405 (6788): 733. doi:10.1038/35015793. S2CID 5336222.
- Dawkins, R. (2002). "Should doctors be Darwinian?". Transactions of the Medical Society of London. 119: 15–30. PMID 17184029.
- Blakemore C, Dawkins R, Noble D, Yudkin M (2003). "Is a scientific boycott ever justified?". Nature. 421 (6921): 314. doi:10.1038/421314b. PMID 12540875. S2CID 47249920.
- Dawkins, R. (2003). "The evolution of evolvability". On Growth, Form and Computers. London: Academic Press.
- Dawkins, R. (2004). "Viruses of the mind". In Warburton, N. (ed.). Philosophy: Basic Readings. New York: Routledge. ISBN 978-0-415-33798-4.
- Dawkins, R. (June 2004). "Extended phenotype - But not too extended. A reply to Laland, Turner and Jablonka". Biology & Philosophy. 19 (3): 377–396. doi:10.1023/B:BIPH.0000036180.14904.96. S2CID 85750258.

== Forewords ==
Richard Dawkins has also written forewords to books, including:

- Red Strangers by Elspeth Huxley, republished by Penguin Books, 1999.
- The Meme Machine by Susan Blackmore, Oxford University Press, 1999.
- Pyramids of Life by Harvey Croze and John Reader, Harvill Press, 2000.
- Snake Oil and Other Preoccupations by John Diamond, Vintage, 2001.
- The Lion Children, by Angus, Maisie and Travers McNeice, Orion Books, 2001.
- A new student edition of Charles Darwin's The Descent of Man, Gibson Square Books, 2002.
- A Thousand Brains: A New Theory of Intelligence by Jeff Hawkins, Basic Books, 2021
