= Cyril Hopkins =

Cyril Hopkins may refer to:

- Cyril Hopkins (cricketer) (1882–1968), New Zealand cricketer
- Cyril G. Hopkins (1866–1919), American agricultural chemist
