= Flight of Fancy =

Flight of Fancy may refer to:

- Flight of Fancy, a 2000 Puerto Rican film directed and co-written by Noel Quiñones
- Flight of Fancy, a song by the American rock band Interpol

Flights of Fancy may refer to:

- Flights of Fancy, a 2006 EP by Lily Frost
- Flights of Fancy: Defying Gravity by Design and Evolution, a 2021 book by Richard Dawkins and Jana Lenzová
- Flights of Fancy: Trio Fascination Edition Two, 2000 album by Joe Lovano
- Ah! My Goddess: Flights of Fancy, second season of the Ah! My Goddess animated series
