= The Greatest Show on Earth: The Evidence for Evolution =

2009 book by Richard Dawkins

- First edition (UK)
- Author: Richard Dawkins
- Language: English
- Subject: Evolution
- Publisher: Free Press, Transworld
- Publication date: 3 September 2009 (UK); 22 September 2009 (US)
- Publication place: United Kingdom
- Media type: Print
- Pages: 470 pp.
- ISBN: 978-0-593-06173-2
- OCLC: 390663505
- Preceded by: The God Delusion
- Followed by: The Magic of Reality: How We Know What's Really True

The Greatest Show on Earth: The Evidence for Evolution is a 2009 book by British biologist Richard Dawkins, which sets out the evidence for evolution. It topped The Sunday Times' Bestseller list, with more than twice the sales of its nearest competitor. An audiobook was released, read by Dawkins and Lalla Ward.

== Background ==
Richard Dawkins has written a number of books about evolution, starting with The Selfish Gene (1976) and The Extended Phenotype (1982). These he followed with three books that outlined the mechanisms of evolution: The Blind Watchmaker (1986), River Out of Eden (1995) and Climbing Mount Improbable (1996). The Ancestor's Tale (2004) traces human ancestry back to the dawn of life.

However, looking back on his work, he felt that he had never comprehensively addressed the evidence of common descent. He thought that 2009, the bicentennial of Charles Darwin and sesquicentennial of his On the Origin of Species, was the perfect time for such a work. He started it during his final months as Simonyi Professor for the Public Understanding of Science (Marcus du Sautoy now holds the position). 2009 saw the publication of similar books, such as Jerry Coyne's Why Evolution is True.

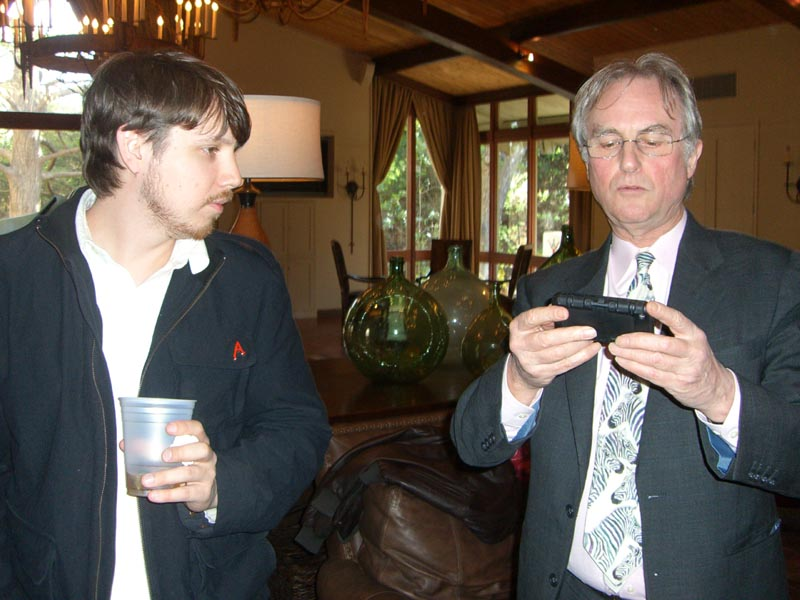
The book is dedicated to Dawkins' technical assistant and web designer Josh Timonen (left).

Dawkins's literary agent John Brockman promoted the book to publishers under the working title Only a Theory. However, American biologist Kenneth Miller had already used that title for his own book, Only a Theory: Evolution and the Battle for America's Soul (2008). He kept "Only a Theory?" as the first chapter title, "with a precautionary question mark to guard against creationist quote-mining".

The title is from a T-shirt given to Dawkins by "an anonymous well-wisher". It bears the words "Evolution: The Greatest Show on Earth, the Only Game in Town". He wore it occasionally while lecturing, and realised it was an ideal title. However, his editor said it was too long so they shortened it. On three occasions, Dawkins wanted to include new scientific findings that emerged late in the publishing process; despite the disruption, the publisher accommodated them.

Dawkins dedicated the book to Josh Timonen, an architect of RichardDawkins.net. He writes: "Josh's creative talent runs deep, but the image of the iceberg captures neither the versatile breadth of his contributions to our joint endeavour, nor the warm good humour with which he makes them." He also thanks his wife Lalla's "unfailing encouragement, helpful stylistic criticisms and characteristically stylish suggestions", and his friend Charles Simonyi as he signs off after fourteen years and seven books.

== Synopsis ==
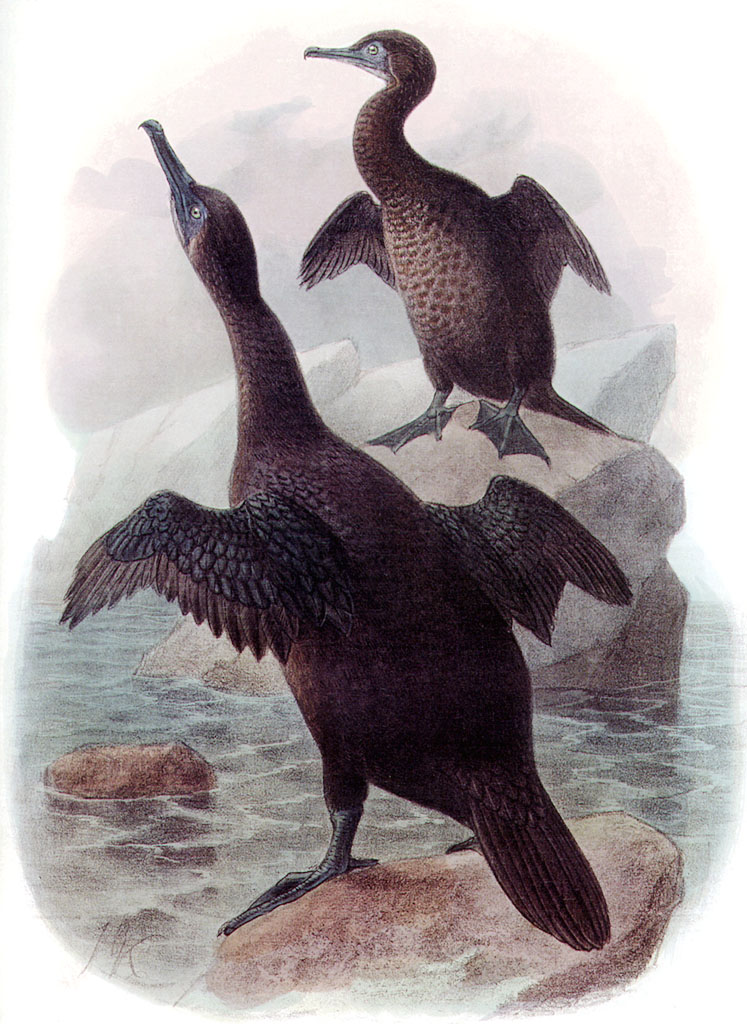
The vestigial wings of the flightless cormorant, which it still hangs out to dry, are discussed in the book.

The book consists of 13 chapters.

- "Only a theory?" examines evolution as theory and fact. He cites the Oxford English Dictionary's definition of "theory": “A scheme or system of ideas or statements held as an explanation or account of a group of facts or phenomena; a hypothesis that has been confirmed or established by observation or experiment, and is propounded or accepted as accounting for the known facts; a statement of what are held to be the general laws, principles, or causes of something known or observed.”
- "Dogs, cows and cabbages" examines artificial selection, which Dawkins calls "sculpting the gene pool." He notes that from wild cabbage, breeders have made "broccoli, cauliflower, kohlrabi, kale, Brussels sprouts, spring greens, romanescu and, of course, the various kinds of vegetables that are still commonly called cabbage. ... Another familiar example is the sculpting of the wolf, Canis lupus, into the two hundred or so breeds of dog, Canis familiaris, that are recognized as separate by the UK Kennel Club.”
- "The primrose path to macro-evolution" examines coevolution. Flowers produce nectar to lure pollinators. Bees select for floral beauty, albeit unconsciously. Beauty is in the eye of the beholder. Oenothera has evolved patterns invisible to us but not to bees, who see in ultraviolet light. There is an orchid, Angraecum sesquipedale, with a sixteen-inch nectary. Darwin and Alfred Russel Wallace, who codiscovered the engine of evolution, made a prediction: there must be a moth with a proboscis long enough to pollinate it. Such a moth, Xanthopan, was discovered. Orchids like Drakaea have evolved to mimic female insects. (Dawkins discussed this in his Royal Institution Christmas Lectures, in “The Ultraviolet Garden.”) He revisits artificial selection, describing Cyril G. Hopkins's Illinois long-term selection experiment and Dmitry Belyaev’s work on the domesticated silver fox. He introduces sexual selection, “selective breeding by females of males.” This leads to natural selection, in which “nature is the selecting agent.”
- "Silence and slow time" examines the age of the Earth and geologic time. Dawkins describes various means of dating the earth, notably dendrochronology and uranium-lead dating.
  Before our very eyes: the evolution of bacteria in the Lenski experiment
- "Before our very eyes" examines examples of evolution in the field and in the lab. In 1971, a population of Podarcis sicula from the island of Pod Kopiste was transported to the island of Pod Mrcaru. In 2008, a group of scientists led by Anthony Herrel found that the lizards had evolved stronger jaws to adapt to a vegetarian diet, and have started to evolve a cecum. Dawkins describes Richard Lenski's E. coli long-term evolution experiment, in which 12 strains of E. coli were grown in flasks with glucose as a limiting factor. “In these conditions, the Darwinian expectation was that, if any mutation arose that assisted an individual bacterium to exploit glucose more efficiently, natural selection would favour it, and it would spread throughout through the flask as mutant individuals out-reproduced non-mutant individuals.” That is what happened: “As the ‘flask generations’ went by, all twelve lines improved over their ancestors: got better at exploiting glucose as a food source. But, fascinatingly, they got better in different ways – that is, different tribes developed different sets of mutations.” Lenski's student Zachary Blount found that one strain evolved the ability to digest citrate. A tragic corollary is antimicrobial resistance; bacteria have evolved resistance "to antibiotics in spectacularly short periods. After all, the first antibiotic, penicillin, was developed, heroically, by Florey and Chain as recently as the Second World War. New antibiotics have been coming out at frequent intervals since then, and bacteria have evolved resistance to just about every one of them.” He describes John Endler’s studies of the competing pressures of natural and sexual selection. Endler found that in streams without strong predation, male guppies evolved colorful spots to attract females. In streams with strong predation, they evolved camouflage to escape detection. Endler wanted to see if he could recreate this in the lab. He raised guppies in ponds with strong, weak and intermediate predation. After introducing a strong predator, the number of spots plummeted. The sizes of rocks in the ponds also influenced the sizes of spots the guppies evolved.
- "Missing link? What do you mean, 'missing'?" examines paleontology. J. B. S. Haldane was asked for an observation that would disprove evolution. He replied, “Fossil rabbits in the Precambrian!” No such anachronistic fossils have been found. Several transitional fossils have been found, starting with Archaeopteryx, an early bird. He traces transitional fossils in tetrapod evolution: Eusthenopteron (discovered in 1881) and Ichthyostega (discovered in 1932) had characteristics of both fish and amphibians. There was a gap between Panderichthys and Acanthostega; it was filled by Neil Shubin and Ted Daeschler's discovery of Tiktaalik roseae. He looks at the evolution of whales, documented by Pakicetus, Basilosaurus, Rodhocetus and Ambulocetus. He discusses Puijila darwini, a primitive pinniped discovered as the book was heading to press.
- "Missing persons? Missing no longer" examines transitional fossils in human evolution, notably Pithecanthropus erectus (“Java Man”, discovered by Eugene Dubois in 1891) and Australopithecus afarensis (“Lucy”, discovered by Donald Johanson in 1974).
- "You did it yourself in nine months" discusses developmental biology, especially the work of Lewis Wolpert. Haldane was asked how, in evolution, a single cell could give rise to something as complex as a human. His response is the chapter title.
- "The ark of the continents" examines biogeography. Darwin's observations on HMS Beagle (particularly in the Galápagos Islands) led to his theory. Species are found in specific places; lemurs in Madagascar; platyrrhine monkeys in South America; catarrhine monkeys in Africa and Asia. New Zealand has no endemic species of mammals, besides bats (which can cross oceans.) Gaps in Darwin's knowledge have been filled by Alfred Wegener's discovery of plate tectonics. Geographic isolation drives speciation, as a young Darwin intuited.
- "The tree of cousinship" examines the tree of life. Dawkins discusses homology. He discusses Motoo Kimura's neutral theory of molecular evolution. Silent mutations are invisible to natural selection but not to biologists, who use them as molecular clocks to see when species split. Dawkins discusses pseudogenes, vestiges of functional genes: "The very existence of pseudogenes - useless, untranscribed genes that bear a marked resemblance to useful genes - is a perfect example of the way animals and plants have their history written all over them."
- "History written all over us" examines vestigiality (the wings of flightless birds) and unintelligent design (the recurrent laryngeal nerve.)
- "Arms races and 'evolutionary theodicy'" examines evolutionary arms races between predator and prey and host and parasite. “Over evolutionary time, predators get better at catching prey, which prompts prey animals to get better at evading capture.” He examines cruelty in nature, such as Ichneumonidae, wasps that lay their larva in live caterpillars, which they consume from the inside out. Dawkins argues that such things do not reflect a loving creator, but rather evolution by natural selection.
- "There is grandeur in this view of life" is a close reading of the final passage of On the Origin of Species. He writes that understanding evolution ennobles us: "We are surrounded by endless forms, most beautiful and most wonderful, and it is no accident, but the direct consequence of evolution by non-random selection, the only game in town, the greatest show on earth."

== Critical reception ==
The book received mixed to positive critical reception on its release. Writing in The Times, Anjana Ahuja described Dawkins's account of the evidence for evolution as "fine, lucid and convincing". Though she criticised him for aggrandising the role of Islam in the spread of creationism and suggested that his writing style is unlikely to persuade disbelievers, Ahuja described these as merely "quibbles" and recommended the book to all readers. The Economist also featured a favourable review, praising Dawkins's writing style as "persuasive" and lauding its educational value. Mark Fisher in The List called Dawkins a "compelling communicator", adding that the book was "illuminating" and praising the use of humorous anecdotes throughout. The Sunday Telegraph awarded it "Book of the Week", with reviewer Simon Ings describing Dawkins as a "master of scientific clarity and wit". Although Ings felt that anger had interfered with Dawkins's creativity to an extent, he also praised sections of the book as "magical" and "visceral", concluding that there was a "timeless merit" to the overall theme.

The New York Times reviewer Nicholas Wade, while praising the work overall, criticised Dawkins's assertion that evolution can be treated as an undeniable fact and asserted that Dawkins's insistence that it is a fact makes him as dogmatic as his opponents. Moreover, characterising his opponents as "history-deniers", "worse than ignorant" and "deluded to the point of perversity" Wade asserts, "is not the language of science, or civility." Wade sees both Dawkins and his creationist opponents as wrong. Wade's review was subsequently criticised in numerous letters to The New York Times. In one, Daniel Dennett asserted that creationism deserves as much respect as believing that the world is flat. Another letter, from Philip Kitcher, Professor of Philosophy at Columbia University, asserted that evolution and other scientific findings "are so well supported that they count as facts".

== See also ==
- Why Evolution is True by Jerry Coyne
- E. coli long-term evolution experiment – discussed in detail in chapter 5
- John Endler, whose studies of guppies are discussed
- Evidence of common descent
- Endless Forms Most Beautiful, album featuring the song "The Greatest Show on Earth", with quotes from the book read by Richard Dawkins himself.
