= Illinois long-term selection experiment =

Long-term artificial selection experiment conducted on maize

The Illinois long-term selection experiment is an ongoing long-term artificial selection experiment that has been conducted on the kernel of maize (Zea mays) in Illinois since 1896, making it the longest-running directional selection project conducted on plants and one of the longest-running experiments in all of biology. The experiment was initiated by Cyril G. Hopkins, originally with the goal of altering the levels of oil and protein in the kernel. It has proven successful at increasing levels of oil and protein, as well as other related quantitative traits, over more than 100 generations. A 2007 paper about the experiment noted that "progress from selection was much greater than could have been predicted". The paper also highlighted that limits to selection were observed for low, but not high, oil and protein levels.

Richard Dawkins discusses the study in The Greatest Show on Earth: The Evidence for Evolution as an example of the power of selection.
