= Science in the Soul =

Book by Richard Dawkins

- Cover
- Author: Richard Dawkins
- Language: English
- Subject: Science
- Publisher: Bantam Press
- Publication date: June 2017
- Publication place: United Kingdom
- Media type: Print
- Pages: 439
- ISBN: 978-0-593-07751-1
- Preceded by: Brief Candle in the Dark

Science in the Soul: Selected Writings of a Passionate Rationalist is a book of selected essays and other writings by Richard Dawkins published in 2017.

Published after two volumes of autobiography, it is his second essay collection, together with A Devil's Chaplain (2003).

== Description ==
The book was edited by Gillian Somerscales and dedicated to Christopher Hitchens (1949-2011).

It contains more than forty essays, journalism, lectures and letters (organised in eight chapters) about the importance of science.

== Reviews ==
Michael Shermer, editor-in-chief of Skeptic, wrote that "No living scientist is more deserving of such recognition than Richard Dawkins, whose every book reflects his literary genius and scientific substance. Science in the Soul is the perfect embodiment of Nobel-quality literature."

James Randi, author of The Faith Healers, wrote that "Science in the Soul is packed with Dr Dawkins's philosophy, humor, anger, and quiet wisdom, leading the reader gently but firmly to inevitable conclusions that edify and educate, while dropping in periodic bons mots that seize attention rather firmly."
