= Simonyi Professor for the Public Understanding of Science =

Chair at the University of Oxford

The Simonyi Professorship for the Public Understanding of Science is a chair at the University of Oxford. The chair was established in 1995 for the ethologist Richard Dawkins by an endowment from Charles Simonyi. The aim of the Professorship is 'to communicate science to the public without, in doing so, losing those elements of scholarship which constitute the essence of true understanding'. It is a position that had been endowed by Charles Simonyi with the express intention that the holder "be expected to make important contributions to the public understanding of some scientific field", and that its first holder should be Richard Dawkins.

== History ==
[...] if I am asked for a single phrase to characterize my role as Professor of the Public Understanding of Science, I think I would claim Advocate for Disinterested Truth.

— Richard Dawkins, A Devil's Chaplain

Richard Dawkins explained the history of the creation of the chair in a chapter of his memoirs, Brief Candle in the Dark: My Life in Science. In 2008, Dawkins retired and the Oxford mathematician Marcus du Sautoy was elected to the chair.

== List of Simonyi Professors ==
- 1995–2008: Richard Dawkins, biological science
- Since 2008: Marcus du Sautoy, mathematical science

== List of Simonyi Lectures ==
Richard Dawkins established an annual "Charles Simonyi Lecture" at the University of Oxford. He invited the following speakers:

- Daniel Dennett (1999), "The evolution of culture"
- Richard Gregory (2000), "Shaking hands with the universe"
- Jared Diamond (2001), "Why did human history unfold differently on different continents?"
- Steven Pinker (2002), "The blank slate "
- Martin Rees (2003), "The mystery of our complex cosmos"
- Richard Leakey (2004), "Why our origins matter"
- Carolyn Porco (2005), "In orbit! Cassini explores the Saturn system "
- Harry Kroto (2006), "Can the Internet save the Enlightenment?"
- Paul Nurse (2007), "The great ideas of biology "
- Richard Dawkins (2008), "The purpose of purpose"

Marcus du Sautoy, second Simonyi Professor, invited:

- Timothy Gowers (2009), "Open-source mathematics "
- Christof Koch (2010), "Consciousness: confessions of romantic reductionist"
- David Spiegelhalter (2011), "Working out the odds"
- Luc Steels (2012), "Can machines be creative?"
- W. Ian Lipkin (2013), "Of microbes and men: tales of the small game hunter"
- Eric Weinstein (2013 special lecture), "Geometric unity"
- David MacKay (2014), "Why climate change action is difficult, and how we can make a difference"
- Melissa Franklin (2015), "Putting the Higgs boson in its place"

== Bibliography ==
- Richard Dawkins, Brief Candle in the Dark: My Life in Science, Bantam Press, 2015 (ISBN 978-0-59307-256-1). Chapter "Simonyi Professor", pages 271–307.
