= The Lion Children =

1995 book by Angus, Maisie, and Travers McNeice

- Author: Angus McNeice; Maisie McNeice; Travers McNeice
- Language: English
- Genre: Non-fiction, nature
- Publisher: Orion Publishing Group
- Publication date: 28 September 2001
- Publication place: United Kingdom
- Media type: Paperback
- Pages: 216 pp (Orion hardcover edition, 2001)
- ISBN: 1-84255-220-1
- OCLC: 59501572

The Lion Children is a story about a group of children who are taken to Botswana in 1995 by their mother Kate Nicholls to study the behaviour of lions.

The book was praised by British biologist Richard Dawkins who wrote a foreword and said, "This is an astonishing book, by an even more astonishing group of children."
