= The Oxford Book of Modern Science Writing =

Book

- Author: Various
- Language: English
- Subject: Modern science writing
- Genre: Science
- Publisher: Oxford University Press
- Publication date: 2008
- Publication place: United Kingdom
- Media type: Hardcover
- ISBN: 0-19-921680-0
- OCLC: 180014200
- Dewey Decimal: 500 22
- LC Class: Q171 .O87 2008

The Oxford Book of Modern Science Writing is an anthology of scientific writings, arranged and introduced by Richard Dawkins of the University of Oxford. Published first in March 2008, it contains 83 writings on many topics from a diverse variety of authors, which range in length from one to eight pages. All inclusions are dated post-1900, and include poetry, anecdotes, and general philosophical musings.

== Contents ==
The book is divided into four segments. The following is a list of pieces included in each segment.

=== What Scientists Study ===
from:

- The Mysterious Universe by James Jeans
- Just Six Numbers by Martin Rees
- Creation Revisited by Peter Atkins
- The Ant and the Peacock by Helena Cronin
- The Genetical Theory of Natural Selection by R. A. Fisher
- Mankind Evolving by Theodosius Dobzhansky
- Adaptation and Natural Selection by G. C. Williams
- Life Itself: Its Origin and Nature by Francis Crick
- Genome by Matt Ridley
- "Theoretical Biology in the Third Millennium" by Sydney Brenner
- The Language of the Genes by Steve Jones
- "On Being the Right Size", an essay by J. B. S. Haldane
- The Explanation of Organic Diversity by Mark Ridley
- "The Importance of the Nervous System in the Evolution of Animal Flight" by John Maynard Smith
- Man in the Universe by Fred Hoyle
- On Growth and Form by D'Arcy Thompson
- The Meaning of Evolution by G. G. Simpson
- Trilobite! by Richard Fortey
- The Mind Machine by Colin Blakemore
- Mirrors in Mind by Richard Gregory
- "One Self: A Meditation on the Unity of Consciousness" by Nicholas Humphrey
- The Language Instinct and How the Mind Works by Steven Pinker
- The Rise and Fall of the Third Chimpanzee by Jared Diamond
- The Life of the Robin by David Lack
- Curious Naturalists by Niko Tinbergen
- Social Evolution by Robert Trivers
- The Open Sea by Alister Hardy
- The Sea Around Us by Rachel Carson
- "How Flowers Changed the World" by Loren Eiseley
- The Diversity of Life by Edward O. Wilson

=== Who Scientists Are ===
from:

- The Expanding Universe by Arthur Eddington
- the foreword to G. H. Hardy's A Mathematician's Apology by C. P. Snow
- Disturbing the Universe by Freeman Dyson
- 'War and the Nations' by J. Robert Oppenheimer
- 'A Passion for Crystals' by Max F. Perutz
- 'Said Ryle to Hoyle' by Barbara and George Gamow
- 'Cancer's a Funny Thing' by J. B. S. Haldane
- The Identity of Man by Jacob Bronowski
- 'Science and Literature', 'Darwin's Illness', 'The Phenomenon of Man', the postscript to 'Lucky Jim', and 'D' Arcy Thompson and Growth and Form' by Peter Medawar
- Self-Made Man by Jonathan Kingdon
- Origins Reconsidered by Richard Leakey and Roger Lewin
- Lucy by Donald C. Johanson and Maitland A. Edey
- 'Worm for a Century', and 'All Seasons' by Stephen Jay Gould
- Life Cycles by John Tyler Bonner
- Uncle Tungsten by Oliver Sacks
- 'Seven Wonders' by Lewis Thomas
- Avoid Boring People by James Watson
- What Mad Pursuit by Francis Crick
- The Unnatural Nature of Science by Lewis Wolpert
- Essays of a Biologist by Julian Huxley
- 'Religion and Science' by Albert Einstein
- The Demon-Haunted World by Carl Sagan

=== What Scientists Think ===
from:

- The Character of Physical Law by Richard Feynman
- What Is Life? by Erwin Schrödinger
- Darwin's Dangerous Idea and Consciousness Explained by Daniel Dennett
- The Growth of Biological Thought by Ernst Mayr
- 'The Tragedy of the Commons' by Garrett Hardin
- Geometry for the Selfish Herd and Narrow Roads of Geneland by W. D. Hamilton
- How Nature Works by Per Bak
- "The Fantastic Combinations of John Conway's New Solitaire Game 'Life'" by Martin Gardner
- Mathematics for the Million by Lancelot Hogben
- "The Miraculous Jar" in From Here to Infinity by Ian Stewart
- "The Mathematical Theory of Communication" by Claude E. Shannon and Warren Weaver
- "Computing Machinery and Intelligence" by Alan Turing
- 'What is the Theory of Relativity?' by Albert Einstein
- Mr Tompkins by George Gamow
- The Goldilocks Enigma by Paul Davies
- The Time and Space of Uncle Albert by Russell Stannard
- The Elegant Universe by Brian Greene
- A Brief History of Time by Stephen Hawking

=== What Scientists Delight In ===
from:

- Truth and Beauty by S. Chandrasekhar
- A Mathematician's Apology by G. H. Hardy
- Dreams of a Final Theory by Steven Weinberg
- The Life of the Cosmos by Lee Smolin
- The Emperor's New Mind by Roger Penrose
- Godel, Escher, Bach: An Eternal Golden Braid by Douglas Hofstadter
- Geons, Black Holes, and Quantum Foam by John Archibald Wheeler and Kenneth Ford
- The Fabric of Reality by David Deutsch
- Carbon from The Periodic Table by Primo Levi
- Life: An Unauthorized Biography by Richard Fortey
- The Meaning of Evolution by George Gaylord Simpson
- Little Men and Flying Saucers by Loren Eiseley
- Pale Blue Dot by Carl Sagan

== Critical response ==
The book received extremely favourable reviews, with New Scientist proclaiming that "if you could only ever read one science book, this should probably be it". Peter Forbes of The Independent praised Dawkins' inclusions, stating that "every reader is likely to make a discovery or two". Steven Poole in The Guardian described it as "a beautiful volume" and "a labour of love" on Dawkins' part. A number of science bloggers did criticise the lack of women scientists included in the book.
