= The Magic of Reality =

2011 book by Richard Dawkins

- First edition (UK)
- Author: Richard Dawkins
- Illustrator: Dave McKean
- Language: English
- Subject: Science
- Publisher: Bantam Press (UK); Free Press (US)
- Publication date: 15 September 2011 (UK); 4 October 2011 (US)
- Publication place: United Kingdom
- Media type: Print (hardcover and paperback)
- Pages: 272
- ISBN: 1-4391-9281-2
- OCLC: 709673132
- LC Class: Q173 .D255 2011
- Preceded by: The Greatest Show on Earth: The Evidence for Evolution
- Followed by: An Appetite for Wonder

The Magic of Reality: How We Know What's Really True is a 2011 book by the British biologist Richard Dawkins, with illustrations by Dave McKean. The book was released on 15 September 2011 in the United Kingdom, and on 4 October 2011 in the United States.

It is a graphic science book aimed primarily at children and young adults. Dawkins has stated that the book is intended for those aged around 12 years and upwards, and that when trialling the book prior to publishing, younger readers were able to understand its content with additional adult assistance.

The book is published in the United Kingdom by Bantam Press, and in the United States by Free Press.

== Title ==
In the first chapter of the book, Richard Dawkins explains what he means with the title The Magic of Reality:

Magic is a slippery word: it is commonly used in three different ways, and the first thing I must do is distinguish between them. I'll call the first one 'supernatural magic', the second one 'stage magic' and the third one (which is my favourite meaning, and the one I intend in my title) 'poetic magic'. [...] What I hope to show you in this book is that reality—the facts of the real world as understood through the methods of science—is magical in this third sense, the poetic sense, the good to be alive sense. [...] In the rest of this book I want to show you that the real world, as understood scientifically, has magic of its own—the kind I call poetic magic: an inspiring beauty which is all the more magical because it is real and because we can understand how it works. Next to the true beauty and magic of the real world, supernatural spells and stage tricks seem cheap and tawdry by comparison. The magic of reality is neither supernatural nor a trick, but—quite simply—wonderful. Wonderful, and real. Wonderful because real.

== Synopsis ==
Most chapters begin with brief re-tellings of creation myths that emerged as attempts to explain the origin of particular observed phenomena. Dawkins selects these myths from throughout the world, including Babylonian, Judeo-Christian, Aztec, Maori, Ancient Egyptian, Australian Aboriginal, Nordic, Hellenic, Chinese, Japanese, and other traditions. Chapter 9 ("Are we alone?") includes contemporary alien-abduction mythology; Chapter 4 ("What are things made of?") omits mythology altogether as Dawkins says that really small phenomena were unknown to primitive peoples prior to the invention of advanced optical magnification equipment, any texts they believed to be divinely inspired having failed to mention such useful knowledge as beyond human experience at the time. Dawkins also revisits his childhood and recalls his initial thoughts on these various phenomena or those thoughts expressed by his young contemporaries. Dawkins gives his critique of many of the myths, such as when he points out that much mythology involves some god's symbolic transgressive act performed just once, and that such one-time acts would be inadequate to explain the mechanism as to why the phenomena continue to happen in unbroken cycles.

In the opening chapter Dawkins explains that although mythic narratives and make-believe are fun parts of growing up, reality—with its fundamental capacity for beauty—is much more magical than anything impossible. The Fairy Godmother from Cinderella cannot magically turn a pumpkin into a carriage outside the bounds of fiction, because pumpkins and carriages possess internal organisation that is fundamentally complex. A large pumpkin randomly reassembled at the most minute level would be much more likely to result in a featureless pile of ash or sludge than in a complex and intricately organised carriage.

In the subsequent chapters Dawkins addresses topics that range from evolutionary biology and speciation to physical phenomena such as atomic theory, optics, planetary motion, gravitation, stellar evolution, spectroscopy, and plate tectonics, as well as speculation on exobiology. Dawkins characterises his understanding of quantum mechanics as foggy and so declines to delve very far into that topic. Dawkins declares that there was no first person, to make the point that evolutionary biologists use the term species to demark differences in gene composition—over often thousands of generations of separation—rather than from any one generation to the next. To illustrate this he undertakes a thought experiment involving family photographs. If, hypothetically, there existed a complete set of photographs of all one's direct male ancestors arranged in order of birth date (or hatch date) from youngest to oldest stretching back millions of generations, from one generation to the next one would not perceive much difference between any two adjacent pictures—looking at a picture of one's grandfather or great-grandfather one is looking at a picture of a human—but if one looked at a picture from 185 million generations back one would see an image of some kind of fish-like animal. Dawkins stresses this point by saying the offspring of any sexually reproducing life form belongs in almost all cases to the same species as do its parents, with the exception of unviable hybrids such as mules.

The last two chapters discuss chaos and the human psychology behind so-called miracle claims such as the examples of Our Lady of Fátima and the Cottingley Fairies. Dawkins presents philosopher David Hume's argument that miracle claims should only be seriously accepted if it would be a bigger miracle that the claimant was either lying or mistaken. Dawkins explains that miracle claims written down in texts subsequently deemed sacred are not exempt from this standard.

== Reception ==
Tim Radford, in his Guardian review, calls the presentation of the physical book "prodigiously illustrated and beautifully designed", and regarding the content says "it is a distillation of so much that Dawkins has written and argued since the publication of The Selfish Gene ... The strength is that he knows his ground. The weakness is that—for a 'family audience'—he deliberately constrains his vocabulary along with the exuberant imagery and belligerence that made his reputation from the start."

The New Scientist article collates the reviews of Andy Coghlan and those of his 20-year-old daughter Phoebe and his 13-year-old son Callum. Coghlan calls the book "a triumph" but wishes Dawkins had a chapter entitled "Why do people do bad things to others?" saying "The book provides a golden opportunity for Dawkins to ask whether we can evolve to treat one another more civilly. Alas, he doesn't seize it." Coghlan also supports Dawkins "encouraging readers to be bowled over by the stunning beauty of reality—a sentiment I thoroughly support. Too few of us wake up each day and reflect on how amazing it is that we are not only alive, but aware of being alive." Phoebe liked the book, she writes "I was unable to put the book down. I found myself enjoying learning exciting new facts and having old ones reinforced. It was definitely no repeat of the classroom scenario... Perhaps the book's greatest asset is that it manages to bring science to life. The vibrant illustrations reinforce this, as do the fun font styles... His style is colloquial, creating a relaxed, lighter tone." Callum, who is closest to the intended age for the book, doesn't need to be persuaded about the bounds of reality, he writes: "Miracles don't exist. Simple as that. The Magic of Reality hasn't changed my views on anything."

Neville Hawcock for the Financial Times praises Dawkins' clarity in explanation: "He really is very good at this. The chapter on rainbows has the clearest explanation of how they appear that I've ever seen." Of the myths Dawkins uses Hawcock writes: "These, straw gods set up for Dawkins to knock down, are not up to the job of accounting for reality but at least give McKean some great subject matter." Meghan Cox Gurdon writing for The Wall Street Journal says: "His tone throughout alternates between real delight over how things work and avuncular pity for the people who persist in seeing an author behind the machinery of the universe... There is no plan, winks Mr. Dawkins, nor any divinity. There is just the 'magic' of the universe unfolding. If that is the view you wish your children to have of the cosmos, then The Magic of Reality will suit you very well."

Bill Gates has also praised the book, calling it "engaging, well-illustrated science textbook offering compelling answers to big questions, from how the universe formed to what causes earthquakes."

BookBub included the book in their list of the "Best Science Books of All Time".

== Wyndgate Country Club controversy ==
During Richard Dawkins' October 2011 book tour, its sponsor Center for Inquiry signed a contract with Wyndgate Country Club in Rochester Hills, Michigan, as the venue site. After seeing an interview with Dawkins on The O'Reilly Factor, an official at the club cancelled Dawkins' appearance. Dawkins said that the country club official accepted Bill O'Reilly's "twisted" interpretation of the book without having read it personally. Sean Faircloth said that cancelling the reading "really violates the basic principles of America ... The Civil Rights Act ... prohibits discrimination based on race or religious viewpoint. ... [Dawkins has] published numerous books ... to explain science to the public, so it's rather an affront, to reason in general, to shun him as they did." The Center for Inquiry Michigan executive director, Jeff Seaver, stated that "This action by The Wyndgate illustrates the kind of bias and bigotry that nonbelievers encounter all the time." Following the cancellation, protests and legal action by the Center for Inquiry against the Wyndgate Country Club were pursued. In 2013 this case was settled in favour of the Center for Inquiry.

== Publication history ==
- 2011, UK, Bantam Press, 272 pages, hardcover (ISBN 978-0593066126)
- 2011, US, Free Press, 272 pages, hardcover (ISBN 978-1439192818)
- 2011, Audiobook, narrated by Richard Dawkins and Lalla Ward (ISBN 978-1846572821)
- 2011, iPad application including animations based on artwork by Dave McKean
- 2012, Black Swan (Transworld Publishers), paperback, 272 pages (ISBN 978-0-552-77890-9)
