= Brief Candle in the Dark =

Second volume of Richard Dawkin's memoir

- Cover of the hardcover edition
- Author: Richard Dawkins
- Language: English
- Subject: Memoir
- Publisher: Bantam Press (Transworld Publishers)
- Publication date: 10 September 2015
- Publication place: United Kingdom
- Media type: Print
- Pages: 416
- ISBN: 978-0-593-07256-1
- Preceded by: An Appetite for Wonder
- Followed by: Science in the Soul

Brief Candle in the Dark: My Life in Science is the second volume of the autobiographical memoir by British evolutionary biologist Richard Dawkins. It was published in English in September 2015.

== Description ==
The first volume, titled An Appetite for Wonder: The Making of a Scientist, tells the first thirty-five years of his life, until the publication of The Selfish Gene in 1976. In Brief Candle in the Dark, Richard Dawkins continues his autobiography until an academic party for and "... on my seventieth birthday,....". He explains his inspirations, ideas, encounters and history. He mentions some of his 'heroes' such as Charles Darwin, Peter Medawar, Niko Tinbergen, Bill Hamilton, John Maynard Smith, Douglas Adams, Carl Sagan and David Attenborough.

He develops subjects such as his scientific work, travels and conferences, his Royal Institution Christmas Lecture (Growing Up in the Universe, in 1991), his work as Professor for the Public Understanding of Science in Oxford, his documentaries (such as The Root of All Evil?) as well as his personal life and his books.

The title of the book is a reference to Shakespeare's Macbeth: "Out, out brief candle! Life's but a walking shadow..." and reminds us of the two sides of Dawkins – the educator who staunchly defends rationalism – and the man who sees poetry in life, existence, and scientific explanations.

== Reviews ==
Kirkus Reviews found the book "an impressive overview". Dwight Garner wrote that the book "presents a public life more than a private one." Steven Shapin wrote that the book is "a loose and multiply digressive collection of reminiscences, anecdotes, addenda, quotes from admirers, and extended quotes from himself."

== See also ==
- The Demon-Haunted World (book by Carl Sagan whose subtitle "Science as a Candle in the Dark" inspired Dawkins' "candle in the dark" title
