= An Appetite for Wonder =

First volume of the autobiographical memoir by Richard Dawkins

- US edition cover
- Author: Richard Dawkins
- Language: English
- Subject: Memoir
- Publisher: Ecco Press
- Publication date: 12 September 2013 (United Kingdom and United States)
- Publication place: United Kingdom
- Media type: Print (hardcover)
- Pages: 320
- ISBN: 978-0-06-222579-5
- Preceded by: The Magic of Reality
- Followed by: Brief Candle in the Dark

An Appetite for Wonder: The Making of a Scientist is the first volume of the autobiographical memoir by British evolutionary biologist Richard Dawkins. The hardcover version of the book was published in both the United Kingdom and the United States on 12 September 2013, and covers Dawkins's childhood, youth, studies and early career up to the writing of The Selfish Gene. A second volume, Brief Candle in the Dark: My Life in Science, covering the remaining part of his life, was released in September 2015.

== Reviews ==
Early reviews were mixed. Marek Kohn of The Independent newspaper described it as warm and generous, while Eric Liebetrau of the Boston Globe states the book's title is "ultimately a misnomer, as much of the narrative is a slog." The satirical magazine Private Eye describes it as "profoundly irksome...colourless....The self-absorption is extraordinary." Instead of providing a reflective memoir Dawkins "huffs and harangues". Leah Libresco Sargeant, writing for First Things, finds the book "invites comparisons with C. S. Lewis' Surprised by Joy. Both are memoirs by thinkers who seemed a little surprised to end up as apologists, much less as writers whom growing numbers would credit with their conversion or de-conversion."

In a review described by theologian Peter Leithart as "the very definition of withering", philosopher John Gray, writing in The New Republic, criticized the book's "tone of indulgent superiority" and "Dawkins' inveterate literal-mindedness", and commented that Dawkins "writes well – fluently, vividly, and at times with considerable power. But the ideas and the arguments that he presents are in no sense novel or original, and he seems unaware of the critiques of positivism that appeared in its Victorian heyday." In his review, which was described by atheist philosopher Stephen Law as "embarrassingly awful", Gray also criticized the frequent self-comparisons Dawkins makes to Darwin, writing "no two minds could be less alike" and that "(Darwin) understood science as an empirical investigation in which truth is never self-evident and theories are always provisional... Dawkins sees science as the triumph of certainty over superstition. But he shows very little interest in asking what scientific knowledge is or how it comes to be possible."

In The Independent, Brandon Robshaw describes the book as "[...] a generous appreciation and admiration of the qualities of others, as well as a transparent love of life, literature – and science".
