= Cyril Hopkins (cricketer) =

New Zealand cricketer

Personal information
- Full name: Cyril Cooper Hopkins
- Born: 4 May 1882; Yass, New South Wales, Australia
- Died: 25 September 1968 (aged 86); Wahroonga, Sydney, Australia
- Role: Batsman

Domestic team information
- Years: Team
- 1908/09–1912/13: Otago

Career statistics
Competition	First-class
Matches	9
Runs scored	448
Batting average	26.35
100s/50s	1/1
Top score	132
Balls bowled	60
Wickets	0
Bowling average	–
5 wickets in innings	–
10 wickets in match	–
Best bowling	–
Catches/stumpings	2/–
- Source: Cricinfo, 8 February 2021

Cyril Cooper Hopkins (4 May 1882 – 25 September 1968) was a New Zealand cricketer. He played nine first-class matches for Otago between 1908 and 1913.

After playing grade cricket in Sydney, Hopkins moved to Dunedin in 1908. In the Plunket Shield in 1911–12 he became the first Otago batsman to score a century against Canterbury, though the annual first-class match between the two had been held since 1863–64. Opening the batting, he scored 132, exactly double the next-highest score in the match, but Canterbury won by three wickets.

Hopkins returned to Sydney in 1913, just when he was contending for a place in the New Zealand team. He married Thelma Rickaby in Brisbane in January 1924.
