= The Genetic Book of the Dead =

2024 book by Richard Dawkins

Genetic Book of the Dead
- Author: Richard Dawkins
- Illustrator: Jana Lenzová
- Publisher: Yale University Press
- Publication date: 2024
- Pages: 360
- ISBN: 9780300278095

The Genetic Book of the Dead: A Darwinian Reverie is a 2024 book by Richard Dawkins which explores the idea that every organism may eventually be read as if it were a "book" by a future biologist with an advanced technology and understanding of the fossil record.
