= John Diamond (journalist) =

British journalist and broadcaster (1953–2001)

- Born: 10 May 1953; Hackney, London, England
- Died: 2 March 2001 (aged 47); Westminster, London, England
- Occupation: Journalist
- Employer(s): The Sunday Times; Daily Mirror
- Spouse: Nigella Lawson (m. 1992)
- Children: 2

John Diamond (10 May 1953 – 2 March 2001) was a British journalist and broadcaster. In 1997 he was diagnosed with throat cancer, a subject he wrote about in his weekly column at The Times, as well as in two books (one published posthumously). He was married to food writer and celebrity chef Nigella Lawson from 1992 until his death in 2001, and had two children.

== Education and training ==
Diamond was the son of a biochemist and a fashion designer, and had a secular Jewish upbringing. He grew up in Upper Clapton and Woodford Green, he then attended the City of London School and trained as an English teacher at Trent Park College of Education, now part of Middlesex University. Later he taught at an all-girls secondary school, Dalston Mount Comprehensive in Hackney, London, before switching to journalism.

== Journalism ==
Diamond wrote a regular column for the Saturday edition of The Times from 1992 onwards called "Something for the Weekend", and worked as a presenter on BBC radio and television. He met his second wife, Nigella Lawson, when they were both writing for The Sunday Times. They married in Venice in 1992 and had two children.

== Illness, awards and death ==
In 1997, Diamond was diagnosed with throat cancer. He wrote about his experiences with cancer in his newspaper column, for which he won a What The Papers Say award. In 1999, he was shortlisted for the Samuel Johnson Prize for his book C: Because Cowards Get Cancer Too.... The healthcare journal Bandolier reviewed and recommended Diamond's book. A BBC documentary was filmed for Inside Story which followed him through treatment, and showed his frustration with his speech difficulties following throat, and later tongue, surgery.

C: Because Cowards Get Cancer Too... was adapted into a play by Victoria Coren Mitchell called A Lump In My Throat, which was itself later adapted for television. Diamond's second book, Snake Oil and Other Preoccupations, was edited by his brother-in-law Dominic Lawson, editor of The Sunday Telegraph, and published posthumously (with a foreword by Richard Dawkins). It contained the six chapters of his "uncomplimentary look at the world of complementary medicine" which he had completed before his death, and some of his columns from The Times and The Jewish Chronicle.

Diamond was the recipient of the HealthWatch Award for 2000.

== Publications ==
- John Diamond, C: Because Cowards Get Cancer Too..., Vermilion, 1999 (ISBN 0-09-181665-3)
- John Diamond, Richard Dawkins (foreword), Dominic Lawson (editor), Snake Oil and Other Preoccupations, Vintage, 2001 (ISBN 0-09-942833-4).
