= Flights of Fancy: Defying Gravity by Design and Evolution =

Book by Richard Dawkins

- Author: Richard Dawkins
- Language: English
- Subject: Animal flight
- Published: 2021 (Head of Zeus, London)
- Publication place: United Kingdom
- Media type: Print
- Pages: 294
- ISBN: 1838937854
- OCLC: 1299256370
- LC Class: QP310.F5
- Preceded by: Books Do Furnish a Life: Reading and Writing Science

Flights of Fancy: Defying Gravity by Design and Evolution is a 2021 book written by Richard Dawkins and illustrated by Jana Lenzová.

== Themes ==
Flights of Fancy talks about almost every aspect of flying–all the different ways of defying gravity–in imagination and in technology, in humans and in animals. It ranges over many instances of flight including the Wright brothers, Greek mythology, extinct and living birds, helicopters, insects, bats, and flying squirrels.

== Reception ==
- Alexander McCall Smith called it "A masterly investigation of all aspects of flight, human and animal... A beautifully produced book that will appeal across age groups"
- James McConnachie in The Times said, "Dawkins has always been an extraordinarily muscular, persuasive thinker. What feels new here is that he writes with such charm and warmth"
