= Cyril G. Hopkins =

American agricultural chemist (1866–1919)

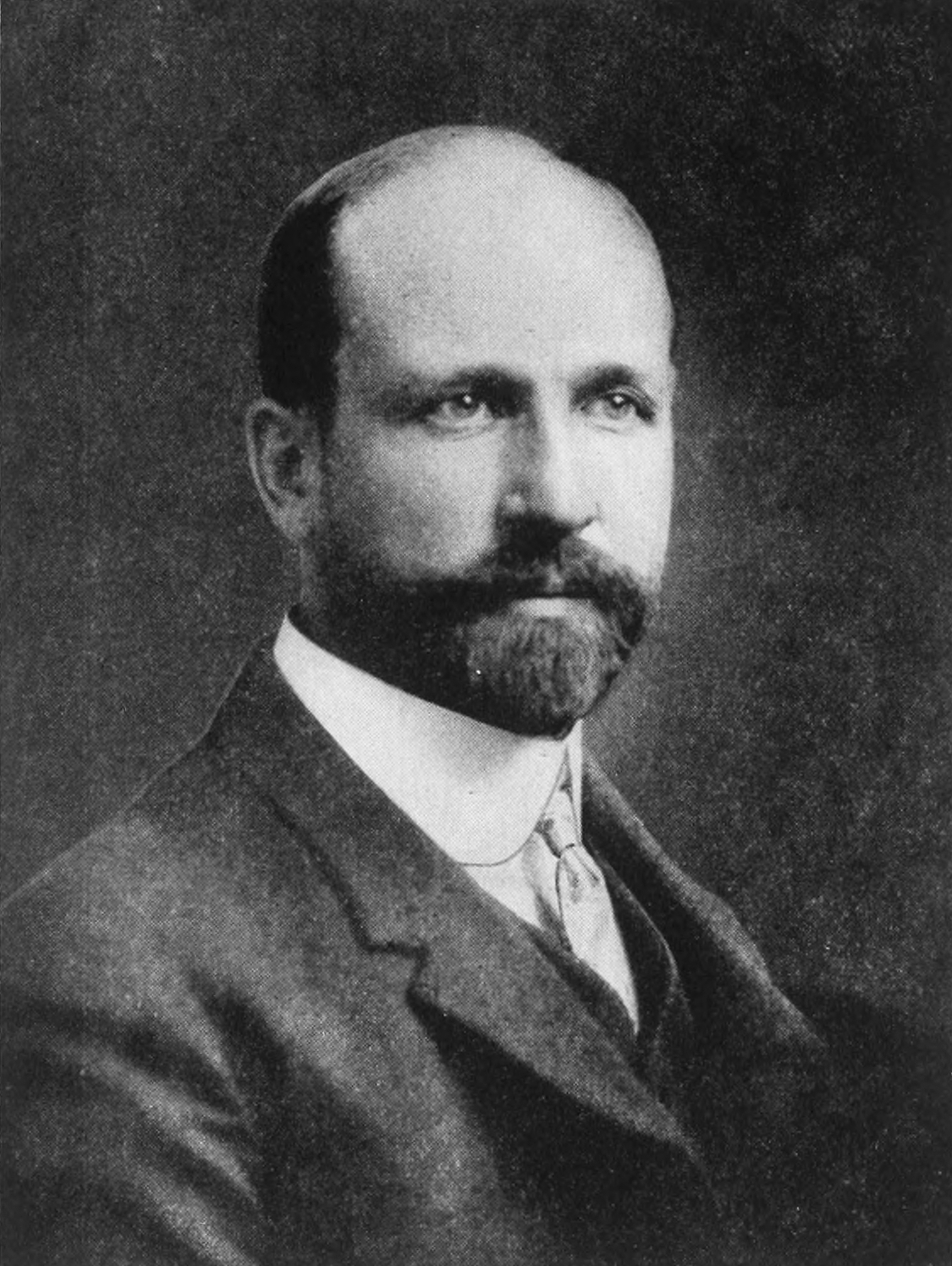
- Born: July 22, 1866; Minnesota
- Died: October 6, 1919 (aged 53); Gibraltar
- Education: South Dakota Agricultural College; Cornell University
- Known for: Illinois long-term selection experiment
- Spouse: Emma Matilda Stelter (m. 1893)
- Scientific career
- Fields: Agricultural chemistry
- Institutions: University of Illinois
- Thesis: The Chemistry of the Corn Kernel (1898)
- Doctoral advisor: George Chapman Caldwell

Cyril George Hopkins (July 22, 1866 – October 6, 1919) was an American agricultural chemist who initiated the Illinois long-term selection experiment in 1896. He was also noted for his extensive research and writings on the soil of Illinois.

Hopkins was born on July 22, 1866, on a farm near Chatfield, Minnesota. He graduated from South Dakota Agricultural College in Brookings, South Dakota in 1890. He received his master's degree in 1894 and his doctoral degree in 1898, both from Cornell University. In 1894, Hopkins became the chemist at the Agriculture Experiment Station at the University of Illinois, where he continued to work until his death from malaria in 1919. At the time of his death, he was the head of the Department of Agronomy at the University of Illinois. Hopkins Hall at the University of Illinois is named in his honor.
