= Richard Dawkins =

British evolutionary biologist and author (born 1941)

Richard Dawkins FRS FRSL
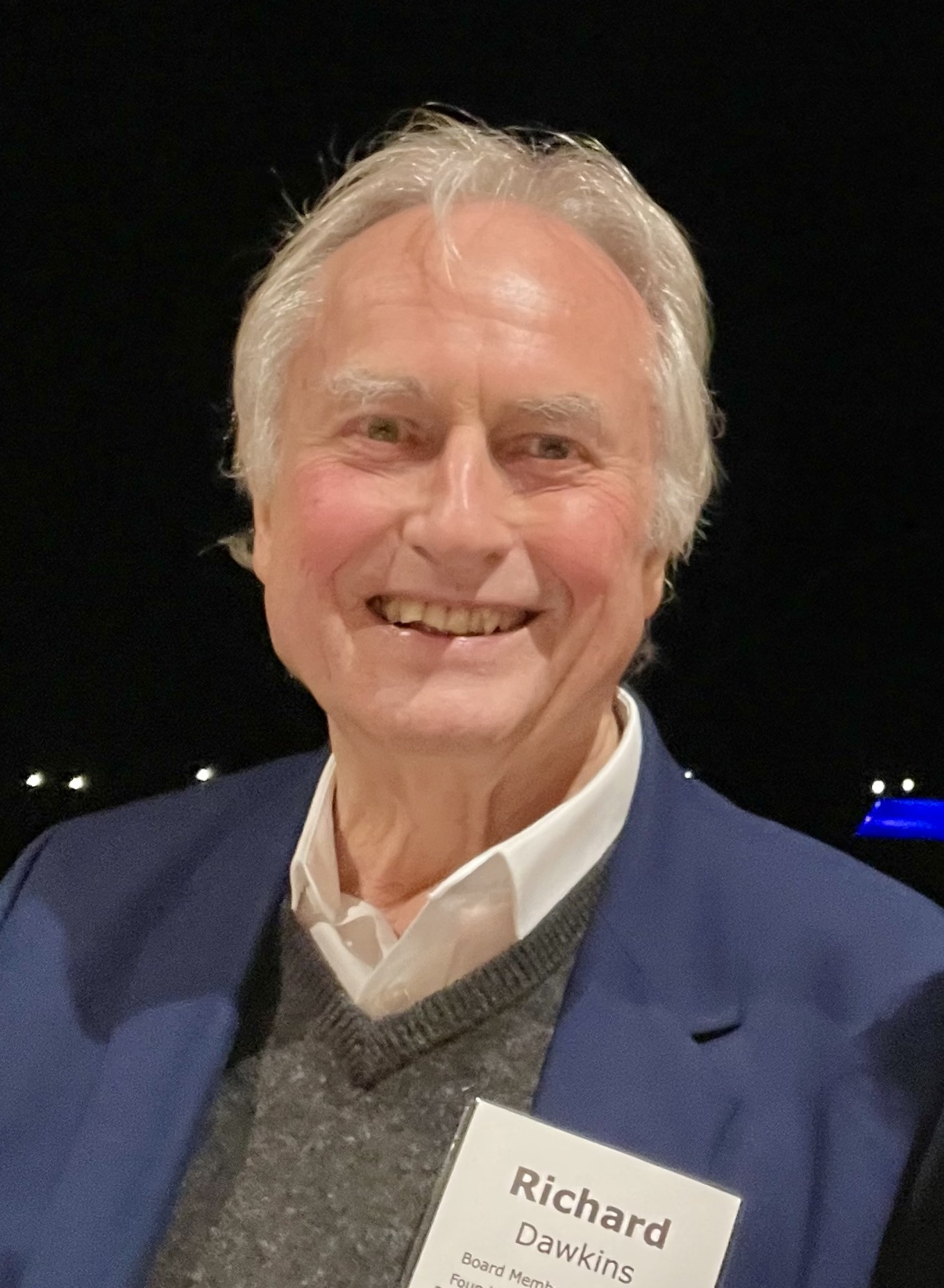
- Dawkins in 2022
- Born: Clinton Richard Dawkins; 26 March 1941 (age 85); Nairobi, British Kenya
- Education: University of Oxford (MA, DPhil)
- Known for: Gene-centred view of evolution; Meme; Middle World; Extended phenotype; Criticism of religion; New Atheism
- Spouses: Marian Stamp (m. 1967; div. 1984); Eve Barham (m. 1984, divorced); Lalla Ward (m. 1992; div. 2016); Jana Lenzová (m. 2021)
- Children: 1
- Awards: ZSL Silver Medal (1989); Michael Faraday Prize (1990); International Cosmos Prize (1997); Nierenberg Prize (2009); Trotter Prize (2025)
- Scientific career
- Fields: Evolutionary biology
- Workplaces: University of California, Berkeley; University of Oxford; New College of the Humanities
- Thesis: Selective pecking in the domestic chick (1967)
- Doctoral advisor: Nikolaas Tinbergen
- Richard Dawkins introducing himself in November 2016
- Website: www.richarddawkins.com

Richard Dawkins (born 26 March 1941) is a British evolutionary biologist, zoologist, science communicator, atheist activist, and author. He is an emeritus fellow of New College, Oxford. In 1995 he was named the first Simonyi Professor for the Public Understanding of Science, a position he held until 2008, and is on the advisory board of the University of Austin. Dawkins has won several academic and writing awards, among them the 2005 Shakespeare Prize and the 2006 Lewis Thomas Prize.

Dawkins has written a number of popular books explicating evolution. In The Selfish Gene (1976), he espoused the gene-centred view of evolution and coined the word meme. In The Blind Watchmaker (1986), he explains how the cumulative, non-random process of natural selection, coupled with random variation, creates complexity. In Climbing Mount Improbable (1996), he explores how complex adaptations gradually evolve through a series of intermediates. The book grew out of his Royal Institution Christmas Lectures, Growing Up in the Universe. With Yan Wong, he co-authored The Ancestor's Tale (2004), a "Chaucerian pilgrimage to the dawn of life". He considers The Extended Phenotype (1982) his major contribution to biology.

Along with Daniel Dennett, Sam Harris and Christopher Hitchens, he is known as one of the "Four Horsemen of New Atheism". He made the case for atheism in The God Delusion (2006), which The Sunday Times described as one of the 12 most influential books since the Second World War. That year he founded the Richard Dawkins Foundation for Reason and Science. He edited The Oxford Book of Modern Science Writing (2008) and wrote a children's book, The Magic of Reality (2011). He published two collections of essays, Unweaving the Rainbow (1998) and A Devil's Chaplain (2003) and two volumes of memoirs, An Appetite for Wonder (2013) and Brief Candle in the Dark (2015).

== Background ==
=== Early life ===
Dawkins was born Clinton Richard Dawkins on 26 March 1941 in Nairobi, Colonial Kenya. He later dropped Clinton from his name by deed poll. He is the son of Jean Mary Vyvyan (née Ladner; 1916–2019) and Clinton John Dawkins (1915–2010), an agricultural civil servant in the British Colonial Service in Nyasaland (present-day Malawi), of a landed gentry family from Oxfordshire. His father was called up into the King's African Rifles during the Second World War and returned to England in 1949, when Dawkins was eight. His father had inherited a country estate, Over Norton Park in Oxfordshire, which he farmed commercially. He has a younger sister, Sarah.

His parents were interested in natural sciences, and they answered Dawkins's questions in scientific terms. Dawkins describes his childhood as "a normal Anglican upbringing". He embraced Christianity until halfway through his teenage years, at which point he concluded that the theory of evolution alone was a better explanation for life's complexity, and ceased believing in the Christian God. He states: "The main residual reason why I was religious was from being so impressed with the complexity of life and feeling that it had to have a designer, and I think it was when I realised that Darwinism was a far superior explanation that pulled the rug out from under the argument of design. And that left me with nothing". This understanding of atheism, combined with his Western cultural background, influences Dawkins as he describes himself in several interviews as a "cultural Christian" and a "cultural Anglican" in 2007, 2013 and 2024.

=== Education ===
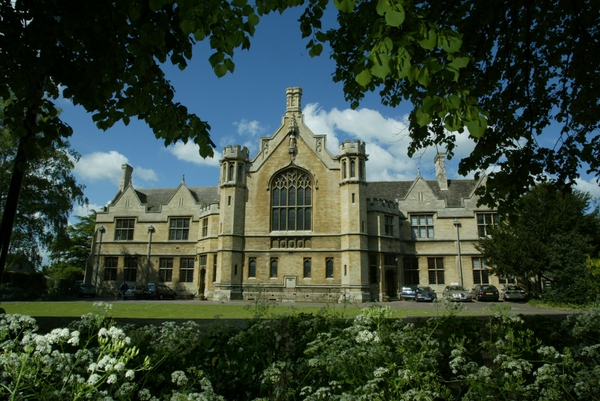
The Great Hall, Oundle School

On his arrival in England from Nyasaland in 1949, at the age of eight, Dawkins joined Chafyn Grove School in Wiltshire, where he says he was molested by a teacher. From 1954 to 1959 he attended Oundle School in Northamptonshire, an English public school with a Church of England ethos, where he was in Laundimer House. While at Oundle, Dawkins read Bertrand Russell's Why I Am Not a Christian for the first time. He studied zoology at Balliol College, Oxford (the same college his father attended), graduating in 1962; while there, he was tutored by the Nobel Prize-winning ethologist Nikolaas Tinbergen. He graduated with a second-class degree.

Dawkins continued as a research student under Tinbergen's supervision, receiving his Doctor of Philosophy (D.Phil.) degree by 1966, and remained a research assistant for another year. Tinbergen was a pioneer in the study of animal behaviour, particularly in the areas of instinct, learning, and choice; Dawkins's research in this period concerned models of animal decision-making.

=== Teaching ===
From 1967 to 1969, Dawkins was an assistant professor of zoology at the University of California, Berkeley. During this period, the students and faculty at UC Berkeley were largely opposed to the ongoing Vietnam War, and Dawkins became involved in the anti-war demonstrations and activities. He returned to the University of Oxford in 1970 as a lecturer. In 1990, he became a reader in zoology. In 1995, he was appointed Simonyi Professor for the Public Understanding of Science at Oxford, a position that had been endowed by Charles Simonyi with the express intention that the holder "be expected to make important contributions to the public understanding of some scientific field", and that its first holder should be Richard Dawkins. He held that professorship from 1995 until 2008.

Since 1970 he has been a fellow of New College, Oxford, and he is now an emeritus fellow. He has delivered many lectures, including the Henry Sidgwick Memorial Lecture (1989), the first Erasmus Darwin Memorial Lecture (1990), the Michael Faraday Lecture (1991), the T. H. Huxley Memorial Lecture (1992), the Irvine Memorial Lecture (1997), the Sheldon Doyle Lecture (1999), the Tinbergen Lecture (2004), and the Tanner Lectures (2003). He also has edited several journals and has acted as an editorial advisor to the Encarta Encyclopedia and the Encyclopedia of Evolution. He is listed as a senior editor and a columnist of the Council for Secular Humanism's Free Inquiry magazine and has been a member of the editorial board of Skeptic magazine since its foundation.

Dawkins has sat on judging panels for awards such as the Royal Society's Faraday Award and the British Academy Television Awards, and has been president of the Biological Sciences section of the British Association for the Advancement of Science. In 2004, Balliol College, Oxford, instituted the Dawkins Prize, awarded for "outstanding research into the ecology and behaviour of animals whose welfare and survival may be endangered by human activities". In September 2008 he retired from his professorship, announcing plans to "write a book aimed at youngsters in which he will warn them against believing in 'anti-scientific' fairytales". In 2011 Dawkins joined the professoriate of the New College of the Humanities, a private university in London established by A. C. Grayling, which opened in September 2012.

Dawkins announced his final speaking tour would take place in the autumn of 2024.

== Career and research ==
=== Evolutionary biology ===
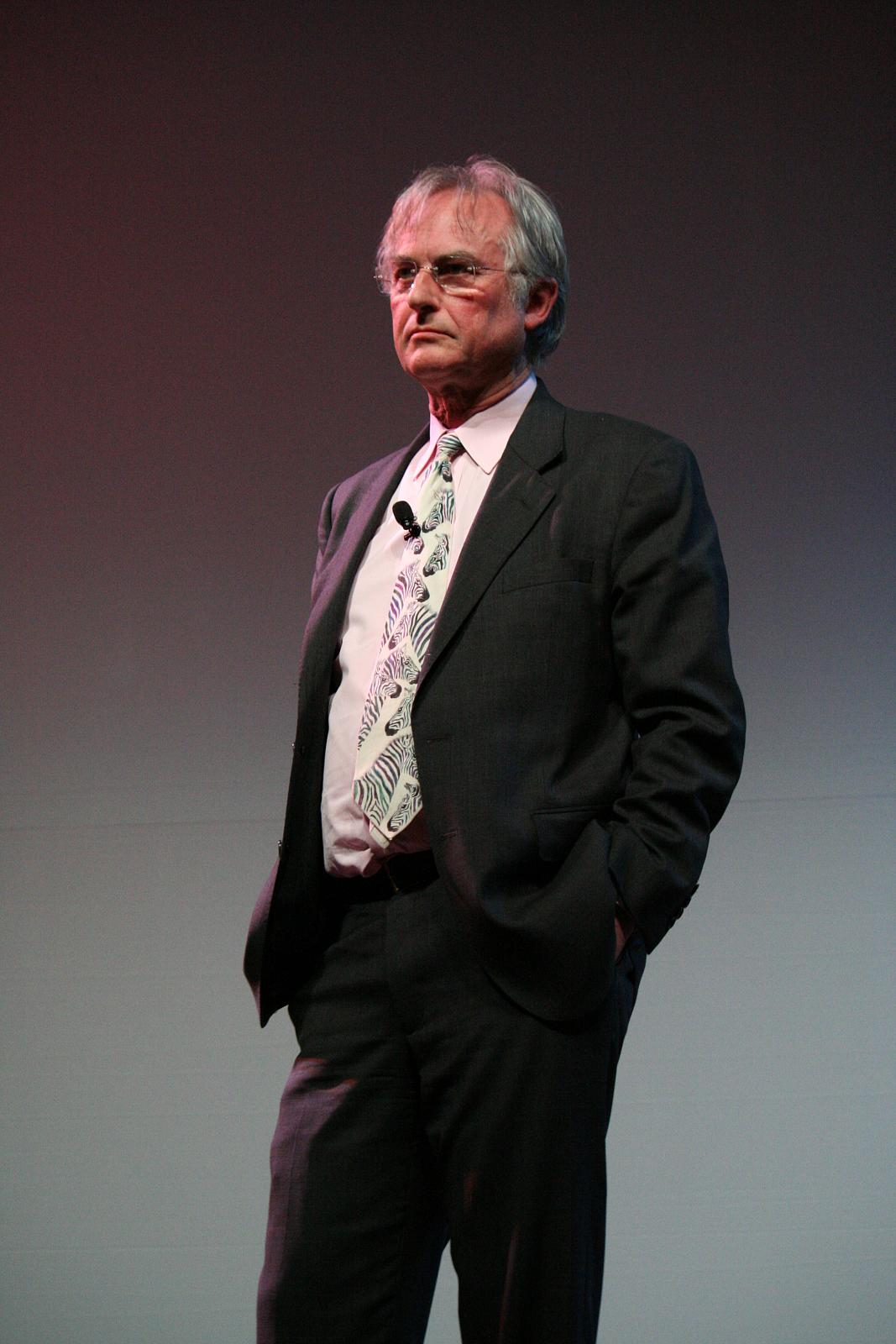
At the University of Texas at Austin, 2008

Dawkins is known for his popularisation of the gene as the principal unit of selection in evolution; this view is most clearly set out in two of his books:

- The Selfish Gene (1976), in which he notes that "all life evolves by the differential survival of replicating entities".
- The Extended Phenotype (1982), in which he describes natural selection as "the process whereby replicators out-propagate each other". He introduces to a wider audience the influential concept he presented in 1977, that the phenotypic effects of a gene are not necessarily limited to an organism's body, but can stretch far into the environment, including the bodies of other organisms. Dawkins regarded the extended phenotype as his single most important contribution to evolutionary biology and he considered niche construction to be a special case of extended phenotype. The concept of extended phenotype helps explain evolution, but it does not help predict specific outcomes.

Dawkins has consistently been sceptical about non-adaptive processes in evolution (such as spandrels, described by Stephen Jay Gould and Richard Lewontin) and about selection at levels "above" that of the gene. He is particularly sceptical about the practical possibility or importance of group selection as a basis for understanding altruism.

Altruism appears at first to be an evolutionary paradox, since helping others costs precious resources and decreases one's own chances for survival, or fitness. Previously, many had interpreted altruism as an aspect of group selection, suggesting that individuals are doing what is best for the survival of the population or species as a whole. The British evolutionary biologist W. D. Hamilton used gene-frequency analysis in his inclusive fitness theory to show how hereditary altruistic traits can evolve if there is sufficient genetic similarity between actors and recipients of such altruism, including close relatives.^{[a]} Hamilton's inclusive fitness has since been successfully applied to a wide range of organisms, including humans. Similarly, the evolutionary biologist Robert Trivers, thinking in terms of the gene-centred model, developed the theory of reciprocal altruism, whereby one organism provides a benefit to another in the expectation of future reciprocation. Dawkins popularised these ideas in The Selfish Gene, and developed them in later work.

Dawkins was highly critical of E. O. Wilson's book The Social Conquest of Earth (2012) as misunderstanding Hamilton's theory of kin selection. Dawkins has also been strongly critical of James Lovelock's Gaia hypothesis.

Critics of Dawkins's biological approach suggest that taking the gene as the unit of selection (a single event in which an individual either succeeds or fails to reproduce) is misleading. The gene could be better described, they say, as a unit of evolution (the long-term changes in allele frequencies in a population). In The Selfish Gene, Dawkins explains that he is using the biologist George C. Williams's definition of the gene as "that which segregates and recombines with appreciable frequency". Another common objection is that a gene cannot survive alone, but must cooperate with other genes to build an individual, and therefore a gene cannot be an independent "unit". In The Extended Phenotype, Dawkins suggests that from an individual gene's viewpoint, all other genes are part of the environment to which it is adapted.

Advocates for higher levels of selection (such as Richard Lewontin, David Sloan Wilson and Elliott Sober) suggest that there are many phenomena (including altruism) that gene-based selection cannot satisfactorily explain. The philosopher Mary Midgley, with whom Dawkins clashed in print concerning The Selfish Gene, has criticised gene selection, memetics and sociobiology as being excessively reductionist; she has suggested that the popularity of Dawkins's work is due to factors in the Zeitgeist such as the increased individualism of the Thatcher/Reagan decades. Besides, other, more recent views and analysis on his popular science works also exist.

In a set of controversies over the mechanisms and interpretation of evolution (what has been called 'The Darwin Wars'), one faction is often named after Dawkins, while the other faction is named after the American palaeontologist Stephen Jay Gould, reflecting the pre-eminence of each as a populariser of the pertinent ideas. In particular, Dawkins and Gould have been prominent commentators in the controversy over sociobiology and evolutionary psychology, with Dawkins generally approving and Gould generally being critical. A typical example of Dawkins's position is his scathing review of Not in Our Genes by Steven Rose, Leon J. Kamin and Richard C. Lewontin. Two other thinkers who are often considered to be allied with Dawkins on the subject are Steven Pinker and Daniel Dennett; Dennett has promoted a gene-centred view of evolution and defended reductionism in biology. Despite their academic disagreements, Dawkins and Gould did not have a hostile personal relationship, and Dawkins dedicated a large portion of his 2003 book A Devil's Chaplain posthumously to Gould, who had died the previous year.

When asked whether Darwinism influences his everyday apprehension of life, Dawkins says, "In one way it does. My eyes are constantly wide open to the extraordinary fact of existence. Not just human existence but the existence of life and how this breathtakingly powerful process, which is natural selection, has managed to take the very simple facts of physics and chemistry and build them up to redwood trees and humans. That's never far from my thoughts, that sense of amazement. On the other hand, I certainly don't allow Darwinism to influence my feelings about human social life", implying that he feels that individual human beings can opt out of the survival machine of Darwinism since they are freed by the consciousness of self.

In 1991, he gave the Royal Institution Christmas Lectures on Growing Up in the Universe. This was the seed of Climbing Mount Improbable (1996), an exploration of how complex adaptations gradually evolve through a series of intermediates. With his student Yan Wong, he coauthored The Ancestor's Tale (2004). Based on Chaucer's Canterbury Tales, it is structured as a "pilgrimage to the dawn of life," with a band of travelers telling tales that illuminate aspects of biology.

He edited The Oxford Book of Modern Science Writing (2008), a selection of prose from such scientists as J. B. S. Haldane, G. H. Hardy and Primo Levi. It is divided into "What Scientists Are, What Scientists Study, What Scientists Think, and What Scientists Delight In". He outlined the evidence for evolution in The Greatest Show on Earth (2009), published to coincide with the sesquecentennial of Charles Darwin's On the Origin of Species (1859). He wrote a children's book on science, The Magic of Reality (2011).

=== "Meme" as behavioural concept ===
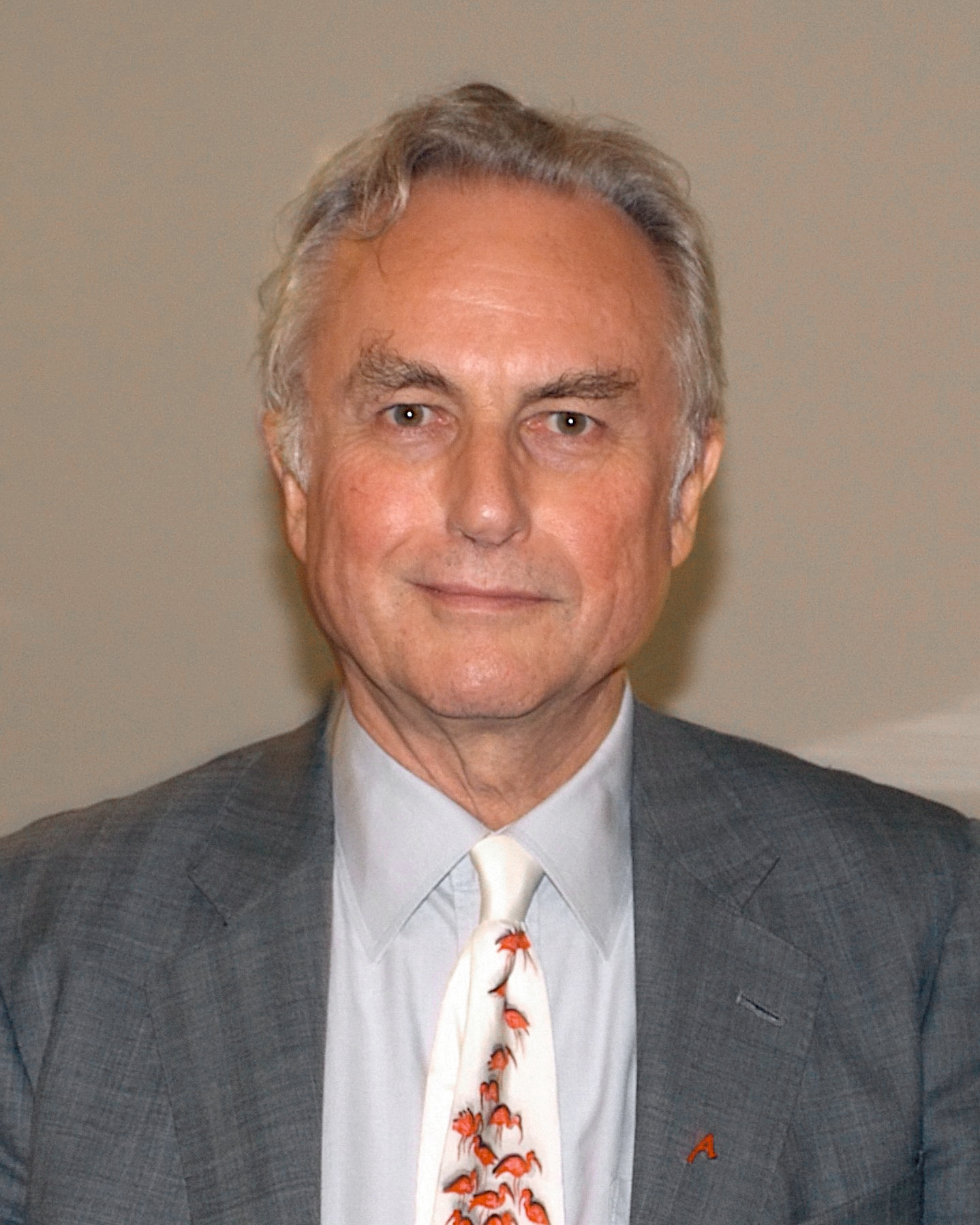
Dawkins at Cooper Union in New York City to discuss his book The Greatest Show on Earth: The Evidence for Evolution in 2010

In The Selfish Gene, Dawkins coined the word meme (the behavioural equivalent of a gene) as a way to encourage readers to think about how Darwinian principles might be extended beyond the realm of genes. It was intended as an extension of his "replicators" argument, but it took on a life of its own in the hands of other authors, such as Daniel Dennett and Susan Blackmore. These popularisations then led to the emergence of memetics, a field from which Dawkins has distanced himself.

Dawkins's meme refers to any cultural entity that an observer might consider a replicator of a certain idea or set of ideas. He hypothesised that people could view many cultural entities as capable of such replication, generally through communication and contact with humans, who have evolved as efficient (although not perfect) copiers of information and behaviour. Because memes are not always copied perfectly, they might become refined, combined, or otherwise modified with other ideas; this results in new memes, which may themselves prove more or less efficient replicators than their predecessors, thus providing a framework for a hypothesis of cultural evolution based on memes, a notion that is analogous to the theory of biological evolution based on genes.

Although Dawkins coined meme, he has not said that the idea was entirely novel, and there have been other expressions for similar ideas in the past. For instance, John Laurent has suggested that the term may have derived from the work of the little-known German biologist Richard Semon. Semon regarded "mneme" as the collective set of neural memory traces (conscious or subconscious) that were inherited, although such view would be considered as Lamarckian by modern biologists. Laurent also found the use of the term mneme in Maurice Maeterlinck's The Life of the White Ant (1926), and Maeterlinck himself stated that he obtained the phrase from Semon's work. In his own work, Maeterlinck tried to explain memory in termites and ants by stating that neural memory traces were added "upon the individual mneme". Nonetheless, science historian James Gleick describes Dawkins's concept of the meme as "his most famous memorable invention, far more influential than his selfish genes or his later proselytising against religiosity".

=== Foundation ===
In 2006 Dawkins founded the Richard Dawkins Foundation for Reason and Science (RDFRS), a non-profit organisation. RDFRS financed research on the psychology of belief and religion, financed scientific education programs and materials, and publicised and supported charitable organisations that are secular in nature. In January 2016 it was announced that the foundation was merging with the American non-profit organisation Center for Inquiry, with Dawkins becoming a member of the new organisation's board of directors.

=== Criticism of religion ===
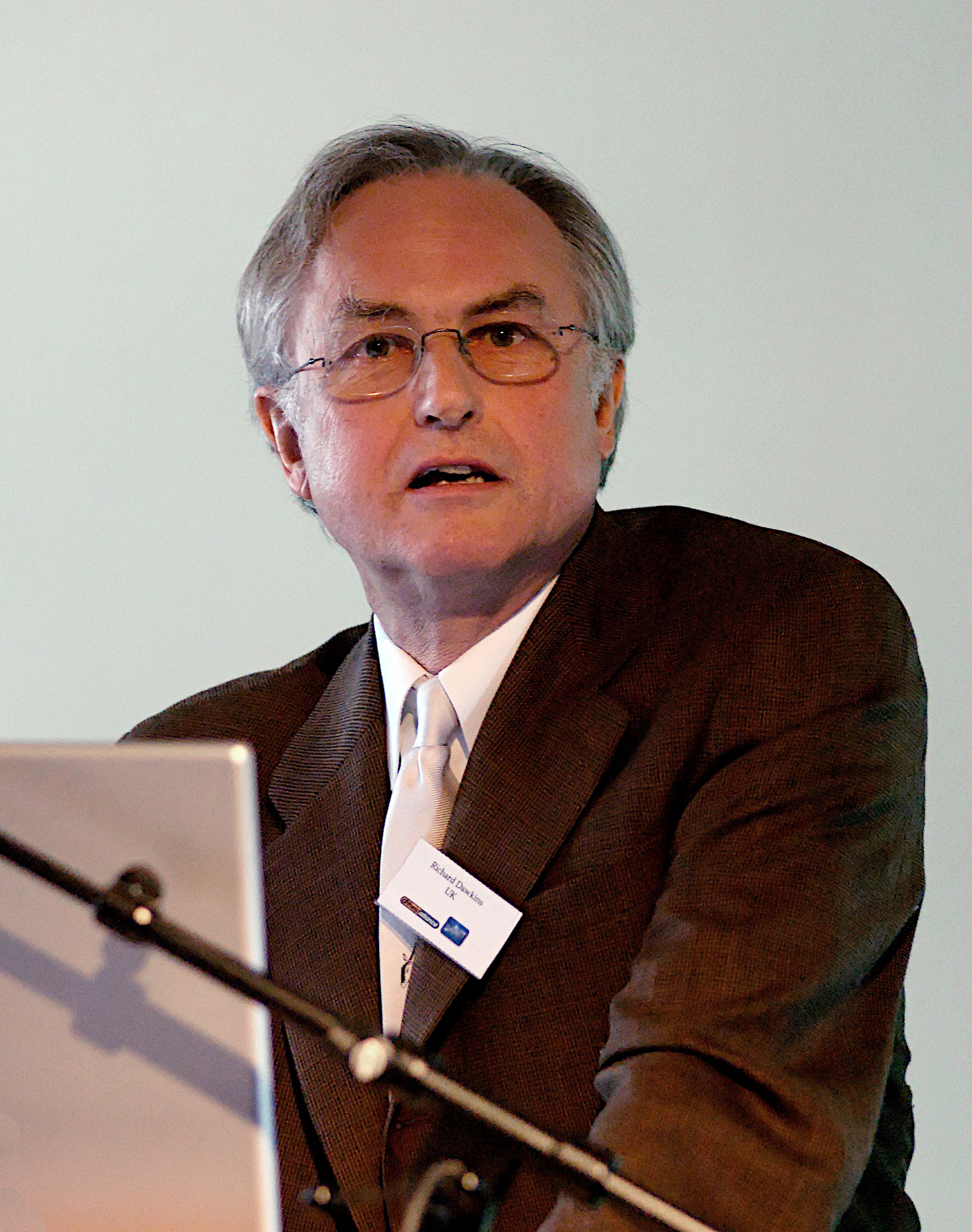
Dawkins giving a lecture on his book The God Delusion, 2006

Dawkins was confirmed into the Church of England at the age of 13, but began to grow sceptical of the beliefs. He said that his understanding of science and evolutionary processes led him to question how adults in positions of leadership in a civilised world could still be so uneducated in biology, and is puzzled by how belief in God could remain among individuals who are sophisticated in science. Dawkins says that some physicists use 'God' as a metaphor for the general awe-inspiring mysteries of the universe, which he says causes confusion and misunderstanding among people who incorrectly think they are talking about a mystical being who forgives sins, transubstantiates wine, or makes people live after they die.

Dawkins disagrees with Stephen Jay Gould's principle of nonoverlapping magisteria, and suggests that the existence of God should be treated as a scientific hypothesis like any other. Dawkins became a prominent critic of religion and has stated his opposition to religion as twofold: religion is both a source of conflict and a justification for belief without evidence. He considers faith—belief that is not based on evidence—as "one of the world's great evils".

On his spectrum of theistic probability, which ranges from 1 (100 per cent certainty that a God or gods exist) to 7 (100 per cent certainty that a God or gods do not exist), Dawkins has said he is a 6.9, which represents a "de facto atheist" who thinks "I cannot know for certain but I think God is very improbable, and I live my life on the assumption that he is not there". When asked about his slight uncertainty, Dawkins quips, "I am agnostic to the extent that I am agnostic about fairies at the bottom of the garden". In May 2014, at the literary Hay Festival in Wales, Dawkins explained that while he does not believe in the supernatural elements of the Christian faith, he still has nostalgia for the ceremonial side of religion.

Dawkins has risen to prominence in public debates concerning science and religion since the publication of his most popular book, The God Delusion (2006). As of 2015, more than three million copies have been sold, and the book has been translated into more than 30 languages. Its success has been seen by many as indicative of a change in the contemporary cultural zeitgeist and has also been identified with the rise of New Atheism. In the book, Dawkins contends that a supernatural creator almost certainly does not exist and that religious faith is a delusion—"a fixed false belief". In his February 2002 TED talk, titled "Militant atheism", Dawkins urged all atheists to openly state their position and to fight the incursion of the church into politics and science. On 30 September 2007 Dawkins, Christopher Hitchens, Sam Harris and Daniel Dennett met at Hitchens's residence in Washington, D.C., for a private, unmoderated discussion that lasted two hours. It was recorded and entitled "The Four Horsemen".

Dawkins sees education and consciousness-raising as the primary tools in opposing what he considers to be religious dogma and indoctrination. These tools include the fight against certain stereotypes, and he has adopted the term bright as a way of associating positive public connotations with those who possess a naturalistic worldview. He has given support to the idea of a free-thinking school, which would not "indoctrinate children" but would instead teach children to ask for evidence and be skeptical, critical, and open-minded. Such a school, says Dawkins, should "teach comparative religion, and teach it properly without any bias towards particular religions, and including historically important but dead religions, such as those of ancient Greece and the Norse gods, if only because these, like the Abrahamic scriptures, are important for understanding English literature and European history". Inspired by the consciousness-raising successes of feminists in arousing widespread embarrassment at the routine use of "he" instead of "she", Dawkins similarly suggests that phrases such as "Catholic child" and "Muslim child" should be considered as socially absurd as, for instance, "Marxist child", as he believes that children should not be classified based on the ideological or religious beliefs of their parents.

While some critics, such as his friend Hitchens, the psychologist Steven Pinker and the Nobel Prize laureates Sir Harold Kroto, James D. Watson and Steven Weinberg, have defended Dawkins's stance on religion and praised his work, others, including the Nobel Prize-winning theoretical physicist Peter Higgs, the astrophysicist Martin Rees, the philosopher of science Michael Ruse, the literary critic Terry Eagleton, the philosopher Roger Scruton, the academic and social critic Camille Paglia, the atheist philosopher Daniel Came and the theologian Alister McGrath, have criticised Dawkins on various grounds, including the assertion that his work simply serves as an atheist counterpart to religious fundamentalism rather than a productive critique of it, and that he has fundamentally misapprehended the foundations of the theological positions he claims to refute. Rees and Higgs, in particular, have both rejected Dawkins's confrontational stance toward religion as narrow and "embarrassing", with Higgs equating Dawkins with the religious fundamentalists he criticises. The atheist philosopher John Gray has denounced Dawkins as an "anti-religious missionary", whose assertions are "in no sense novel or original", suggesting that "transfixed in wonderment at the workings of his own mind, Dawkins misses much that is of importance in human beings". Gray has also criticised Dawkins's perceived allegiance to Darwin, stating that if "science, for Darwin, was a method of inquiry that enabled him to edge tentatively and humbly toward the truth, for Dawkins, science is an unquestioned view of the world". A 2016 study found that many British scientists held an unfavourable view of Dawkins and his attitude towards religion. In response to his critics, Dawkins maintains that theologians are no better than scientists in addressing deep cosmological questions and that he is not a fundamentalist, as he is willing to change his mind in the face of new evidence.

Dawkins has faced backlash over some of his public comments about Islam. In 2013 Dawkins tweeted that "All the world's Muslims have fewer Nobel Prizes than Trinity College, Cambridge. They did great things in the Middle Ages, though." In 2016 Dawkins's invitation to speak at the Northeast Conference on Science and Skepticism was withdrawn over his sharing of what was characterised as a "highly offensive video" satirically showing cartoon feminist and Islamist characters singing about the things they hold in common. In issuing the tweet Dawkins stated that it "Obviously doesn't apply to [sic] vast majority of feminists, among whom I count myself. But the minority are pernicious."

==== Criticism of creationism ====
Dawkins is a prominent critic of creationism, a religious belief that humanity, life, and the universe were created by a deity without recourse to evolution. He has described the young Earth creationist view that the Earth is only a few thousand years old as "a preposterous, mind-shrinking falsehood". His 1986 book, The Blind Watchmaker, contains a sustained critique of the argument from design, an important creationist argument. In the book, Dawkins argues against the watchmaker analogy made famous by the eighteenth-century English theologian William Paley via his book Natural Theology, in which Paley argues that just as a watch is too complicated and too functional to have sprung into existence merely by accident, so too must all living things—with their far greater complexity—be purposefully designed. Dawkins explains how cumulative, nonrandom natural selection is sufficient to creates complexity.

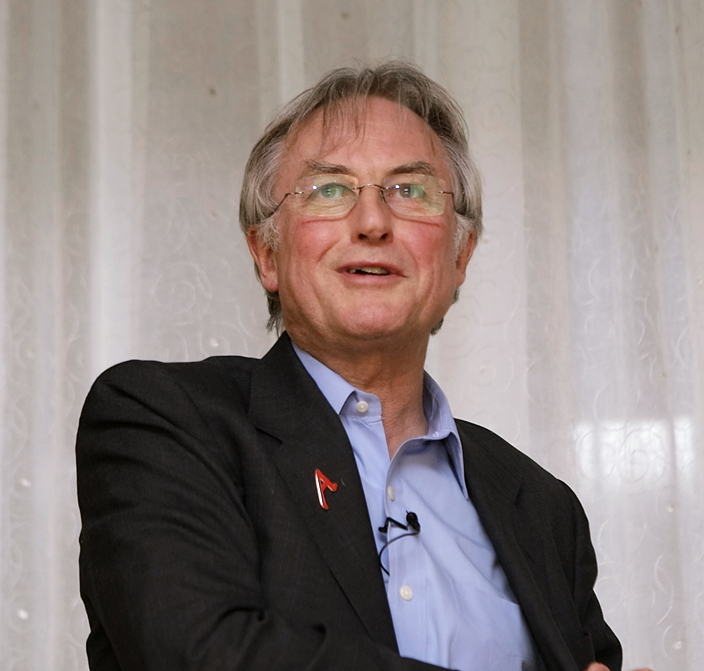
Wearing a scarlet 'A' lapel pin, at the 34th annual conference of American Atheists (2008)

In 1986 Dawkins and the biologist John Maynard Smith participated in an Oxford Union debate against A. E. Wilder-Smith (a Young Earth creationist) and Edgar Andrews (president of the Biblical Creation Society).^{[b]} In general, however, Dawkins has followed the advice of his late colleague Stephen Jay Gould and refused to participate in formal debates with creationists because "what they seek is the oxygen of respectability", and doing so would "give them this oxygen by the mere act of engaging with them at all". He suggests that creationists "don't mind being beaten in an argument. What matters is that we give them recognition by bothering to argue with them in public". In a December 2004 interview with the American journalist Bill Moyers, Dawkins said that "among the things that science does know, evolution is about as certain as anything we know". When Moyers questioned him on the use of the word theory, Dawkins stated that "evolution has been observed. It's just that it hasn't been observed while it's happening." He added that "it is rather like a detective coming on a murder after the scene... the detective hasn't actually seen the murder take place, of course. But what you do see is a massive clue... Huge quantities of circumstantial evidence. It might as well be spelled out in words of English".

Dawkins has opposed the inclusion of intelligent design in science education, describing it as "not a scientific argument at all, but a religious one". He has been referred to in the media as "Darwin's Rottweiler", a reference to the English biologist Thomas Henry Huxley, who was known as "Darwin's Bulldog" for his advocacy of evolution by natural selection. He has been a strong critic of the British organisation Truth in Science, which promotes the teaching of creationism in state schools, and whose work Dawkins has described as an "educational scandal". He plans to subsidise schools through the Richard Dawkins Foundation for Reason and Science with the delivery of books, DVDs and pamphlets that counteract their work.

=== Political views ===
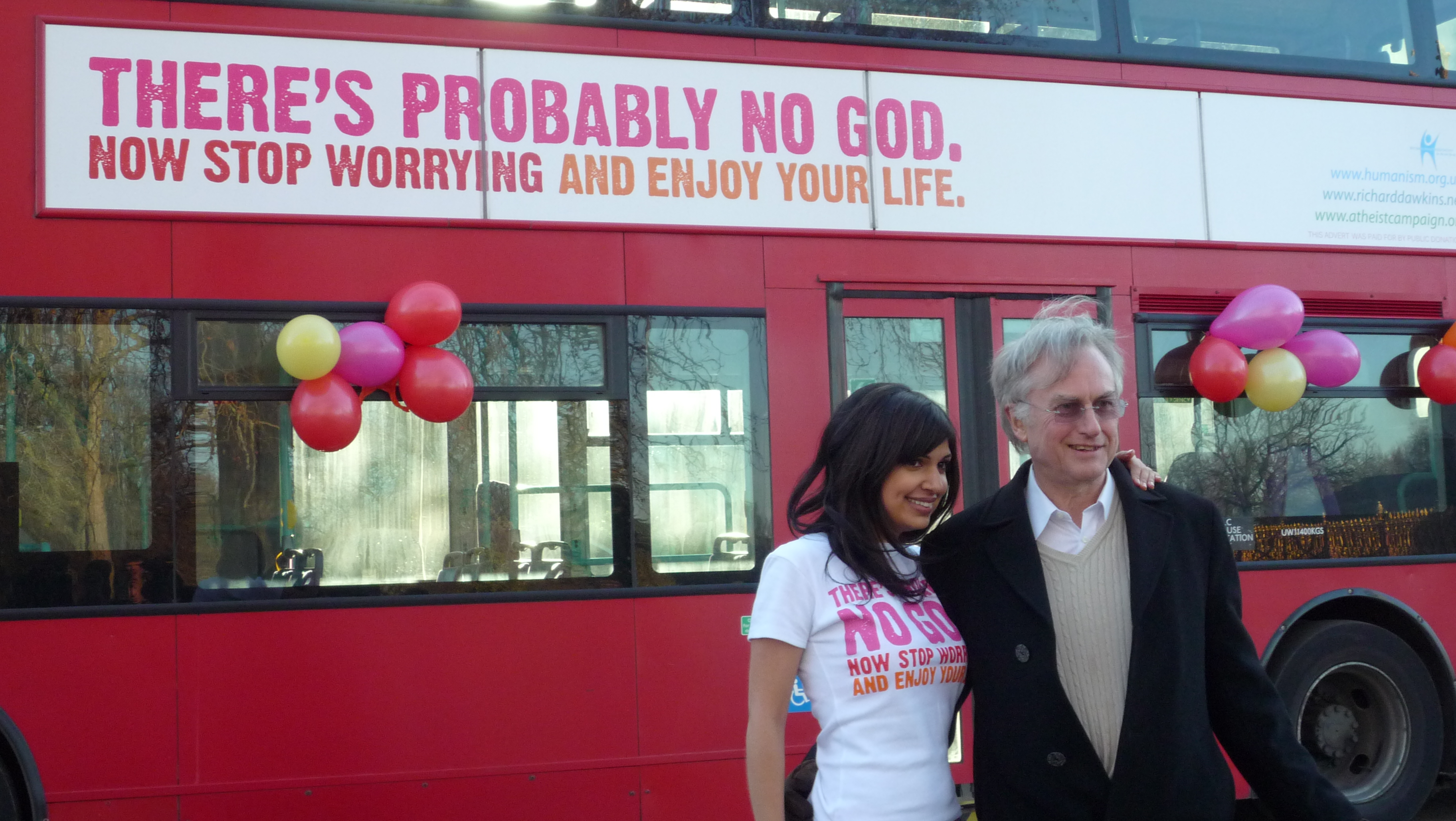
With Ariane Sherine at the Atheist Bus Campaign launch in London, January 2009

Dawkins is an outspoken supporter of various atheist, secular, and humanist organisations, including Humanists UK and the Brights movement. Dawkins suggests that atheists should be proud, not apologetic, stressing that atheism is evidence of a healthy, independent mind. He hopes that the more atheists identify themselves, the more the public will become aware of just how many people are nonbelievers, thereby reducing the negative opinion of atheism among the religious majority. Inspired by the gay rights movement, he endorsed the Out Campaign to encourage atheists worldwide to declare their stance publicly. He supported a UK atheist advertising initiative, the Atheist Bus Campaign in 2008 and 2009, which aimed to raise funds to place atheist advertisements on buses in the London area.

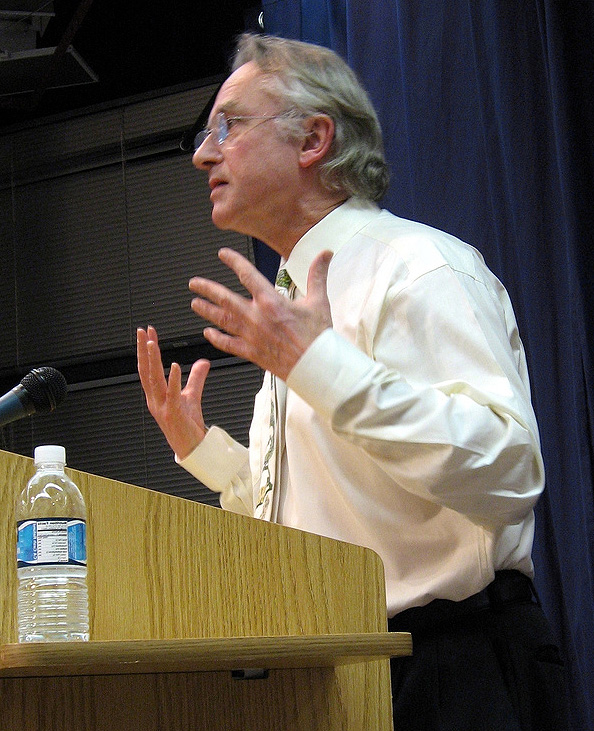
Speaking at Kepler's Books, Menlo Park, California, 29 October 2006

Dawkins has expressed concern about the growth of the human population and about the matter of overpopulation. In The Selfish Gene, he briefly mentions population growth, giving the example of Latin America, whose population, at the time the book was written, was doubling every 40 years. He is critical of Roman Catholic attitudes to family planning and population control, stating that leaders who forbid contraception and "express a preference for 'natural' methods of population limitation" will get just such a method in the form of starvation.

As a supporter of the Great Ape Project—a movement to extend certain moral and legal rights to all great apes—Dawkins contributed the article 'Gaps in the Mind' to the Great Ape Project book edited by Paola Cavalieri and Peter Singer. In this essay, he criticises contemporary society's moral attitudes as being based on a "discontinuous, speciesist imperative".

Dawkins also regularly comments in newspapers and blogs on contemporary political questions and is a frequent contributor to the online science and culture digest 3 Quarks Daily. His opinions include opposition to the 2003 invasion of Iraq, the British nuclear deterrent, the actions of the then-US President George W. Bush, and the ethics of designer babies. Several such articles were included in A Devil's Chaplain (2003), an anthology of writings about science, religion, and politics. He is a supporter of Republic's campaign to replace the British monarchy with a type of democratic republic. Dawkins has described himself as a Labour Party voter in the 1970s and voter for the Liberal Democrats since the party's creation. In 2009 he spoke at the party's conference in opposition to blasphemy laws, alternative medicine, and faith schools. During the 2010 United Kingdom general election, Dawkins officially endorsed the Liberal Democrats, in support of their campaign for electoral reform and for their "refusal to pander to 'faith'". In the run up to the 2017 United Kingdom general election, Dawkins once again endorsed the Liberal Democrats and urged voters to join the party.

Discussing free speech and Islam(ism) at the 2017 Conference on Free Expression and Conscience

In April 2021 Dawkins said on Twitter that "In 2015, Rachel Dolezal, a white chapter president of NAACP, was vilified for identifying as Black. Some men choose to identify as women, and some women choose to identify as men. You will be vilified if you deny that they literally are what they identify as. Discuss". After receiving criticism for this tweet, Dawkins responded by saying that "I do not intend to disparage trans people. I see that my academic 'Discuss' question has been misconstrued as such and I deplore this. It was also not my intent to ally in any way with Republican bigots in the U.S. now exploiting this issue". In a 2021 interview, Dawkins stated regarding trans people that he does not "deny their existence nor does he in any way oppress them". He objects to the statement that a "trans woman is a woman", because it "is a distortion of language and a distortion of science". The American Humanist Association retracted Dawkins's 1996 Humanist of the Year Award in response to these comments. Robby Soave of Reason criticised the retraction, saying that "The drive to punish dissenters from various orthodoxies is itself illiberal".

Dawkins has voiced his support for the Campaign for the Establishment of a United Nations Parliamentary Assembly, an organisation that campaigns for democratic reform in the United Nations, and the creation of a more accountable international political system.

Dawkins identifies as a feminist. He has said that feminism is "enormously important". Dawkins has been accused by writers such as Amanda Marcotte, Caitlin Dickson and Adam Lee of misogyny, criticising those who speak about sexual harassment and abuse while ignoring sexism within the New Atheism movement.

=== Views on postmodernism ===
In Nature, Dawkins expressed his appreciation for two books connected with the Sokal affair: Higher Superstition: The Academic Left and Its Quarrels with Science (1994) by Paul R. Gross and Norman Levitt and Fashionable Nonsense (1997) by Alan Sokal and Jean Bricmont. These books are criticisms of postmodernism in U.S. universities (namely in literary studies, anthropology, and other cultural studies).

Dawkins holds that postmodernism uses obscurantist language to hide its lack of meaningful content. As an example he quotes the psychoanalyst Félix Guattari: "We can clearly see that there is no bi-univocal correspondence between linear signifying links or archi-writing, depending on the author, and this multireferential, multi-dimensional machinic catalysis." This is explained, Dawkins maintains, by certain intellectuals' academic ambitions. Figures like Guattari or Jacques Lacan, according to Dawkins, have nothing to say but want to reap the benefits of reputation and fame that derive from a successful academic career: "Suppose you are an intellectual impostor with nothing to say, but with strong ambitions to succeed in academic life, collect a coterie of reverent disciples and have students around the world anoint your pages with respectful yellow highlighter. What kind of literary style would you cultivate? Not a lucid one, surely, for clarity would expose your lack of content".

In 2024 Dawkins and Sokal co-authored an op-ed in The Boston Globe criticising the use of the terminology "sex assigned at birth" instead of "sex" by the American Medical Association, the American Psychological Association, the American Academy of Pediatrics and the Centers for Disease Control and Prevention. Dawkins and Sokal argued that sex is an "objective biological reality" that "is determined at conception and is then observed at birth," rather than assigned by a medical professional. Calling this "social constructionism gone amok," Dawkins and Sokal argued further that "distort[ing] the scientific facts in the service of a social cause" risks undermining trust in medical institutions.

=== Other fields ===
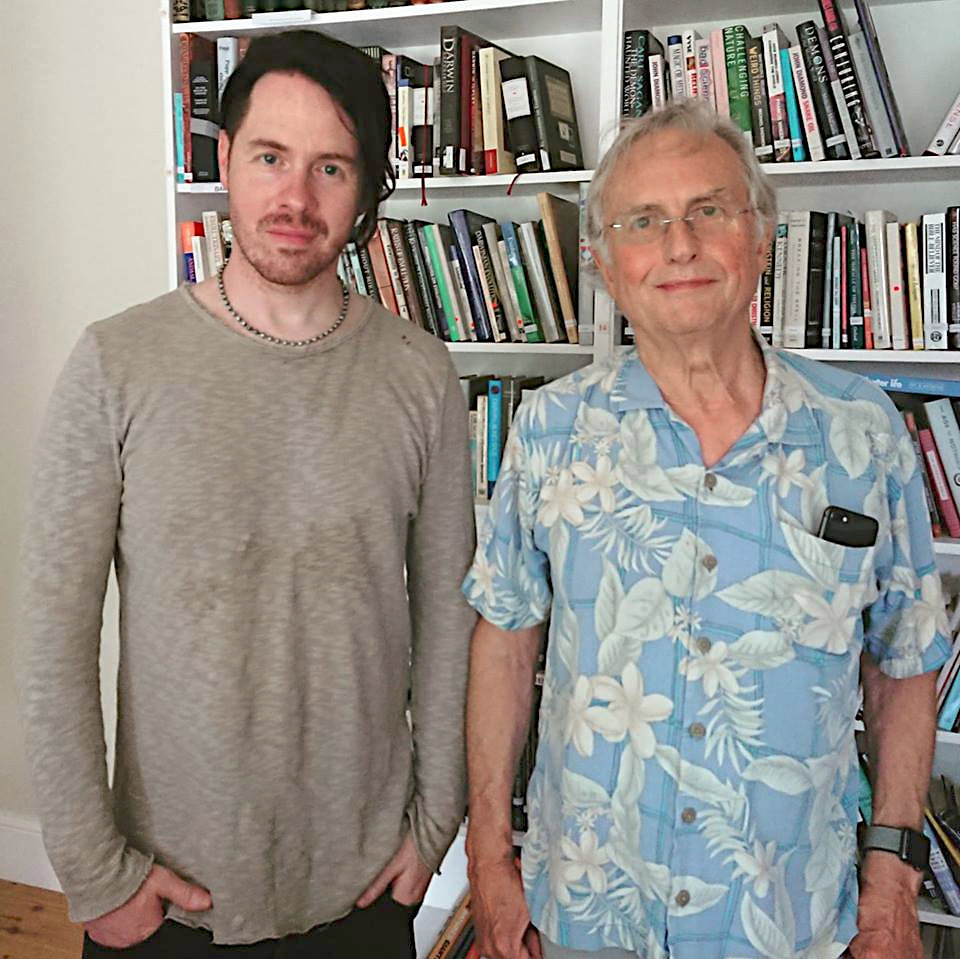
The Welsh musician Jayce Lewis at Dawkins's home in 2018 while working on Million (Part 2)

In his role as professor for public understanding of science, Dawkins has been a critic of pseudoscience and alternative medicine. Unweaving the Rainbow (1998) considers John Keats's accusation that Isaac Newton, in explaining the rainbow, diminished its beauty; Dawkins argues the opposite conclusion. He suggests that deep space, the billions of years of life's evolution, and the microscopic workings of biology and heredity contain more beauty and wonder than do "myths" and "pseudoscience". He discussed "Science's Revelations" with Ian McEwan on In Our Time. For John Diamond's posthumously published Snake Oil, a book devoted to debunking alternative medicine, Dawkins wrote a foreword in which he asserts that alternative medicine is harmful, if only because it distracts patients from more successful conventional treatments and gives people false hopes. Dawkins states that "There is no alternative medicine. There is only medicine that works and medicine that doesn't work." In his 2007 Channel 4 film The Enemies of Reason, Dawkins concluded that Britain is gripped by "an epidemic of superstitious thinking".

Continuing a long-standing partnership with Channel 4, Dawkins participated in a five-part television series, Genius of Britain, along with his fellow-scientists Stephen Hawking, James Dyson, Paul Nurse and Jim Al-Khalili. The series was first broadcast in June 2010, and focuses on major British scientific achievements throughout history. In 2014 he joined the global awareness movement Asteroid Day as a "100x Signatory".

In 2025, he joined John McWhorter to discuss "The link between evolution and language".

In 2026 in an op-ed for Unherd, Dawkins claimed that AI is conscious after a conversation with Anthropic's Claude.

== Awards and recognition ==
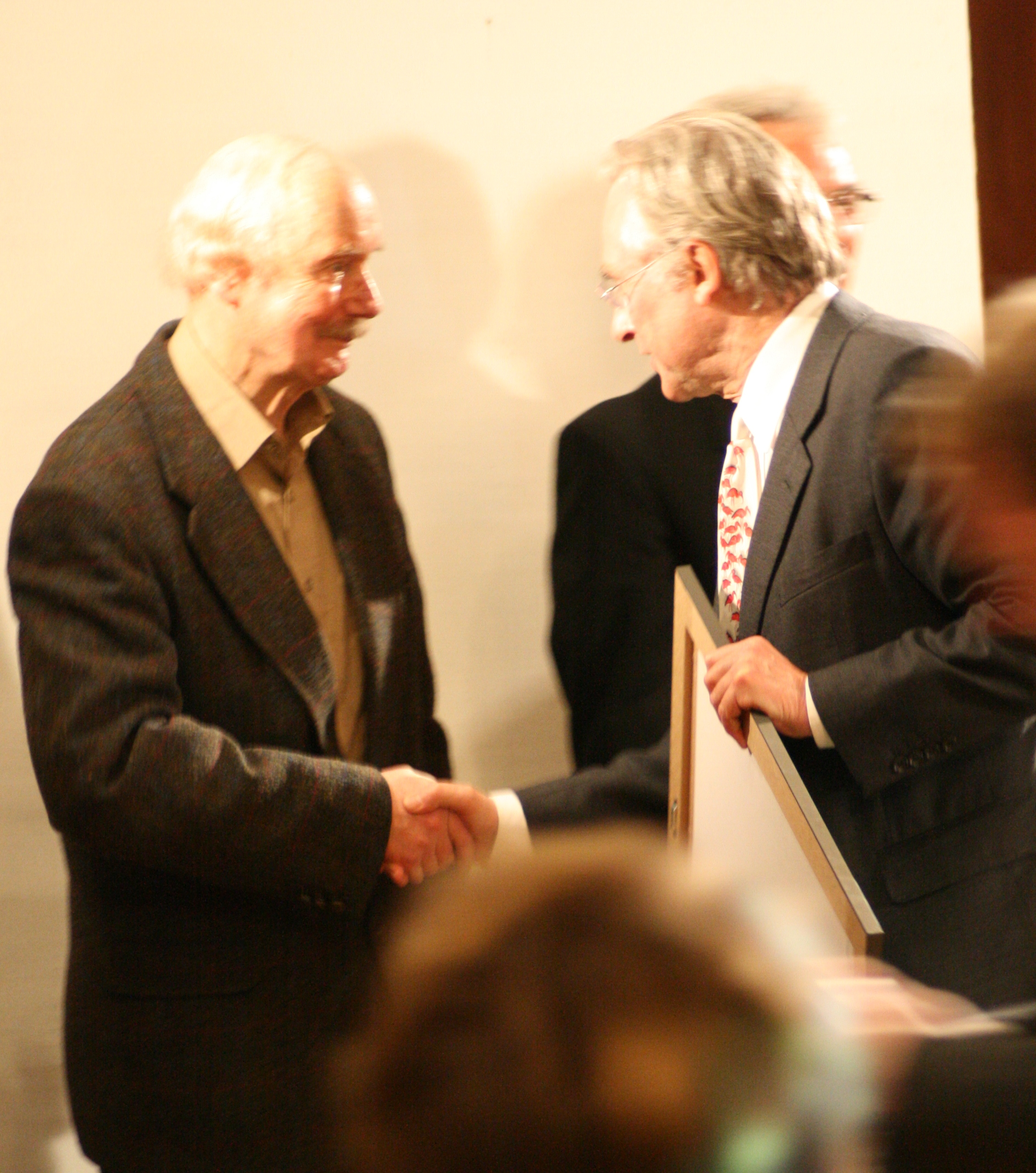
Receiving the Deschner Prize in Frankfurt, 12 October 2007, from Karlheinz Deschner

He holds honorary doctorates in science from the University of Huddersfield, University of Westminster, Durham University, the University of Hull, the University of Antwerp, the University of Oslo, the University of Aberdeen, Open University, the Vrije Universiteit Brussel, and the University of Valencia. He also holds honorary doctorates of letters from the University of St Andrews and the Australian National University (HonLittD, 1996), and was elected Fellow of the Royal Society of Literature (FRSL) in 1997 and a Fellow of the Royal Society (FRS) in 2001. He is one of the patrons of the Oxford University Scientific Society, and also a patron of The Gorilla Organization.

In 1987 Dawkins received the Heinemann Award and a Los Angeles Times Book Prize for The Blind Watchmaker. The same year, he received a Sci. Tech Prize for Best Television Documentary Science Programme of the Year for the BBC's Horizon film of the same name.

In 1996 the American Humanist Association gave him their Humanist of the Year Award, but the award was withdrawn in 2021, with the statement that he "demean[ed] marginalized groups", including transgender people, using "the guise of scientific discourse".

Dawkins has received the Zoological Society of London's Silver Medal (1989), the Finlay Innovation Award (1990), the Michael Faraday Award (1990), the Nakayama Prize (1994), the fifth International Cosmos Prize (1997), the Kistler Prize (2001), the Medal of the Presidency of the Italian Republic (2001), the 2001 and 2012 Emperor Has No Clothes Award from the Freedom From Religion Foundation, the Bicentennial Kelvin Medal of The Royal Philosophical Society of Glasgow (2002), the Golden Plate Award of the American Academy of Achievement (2006) and the Nierenberg Prize for Science in the Public Interest (2009). He was awarded the Deschner Award, named after the German anti-clerical author Karlheinz Deschner. The Committee for Skeptical Inquiry (CSICOP) has awarded Dawkins their highest award In Praise of Reason (1992).

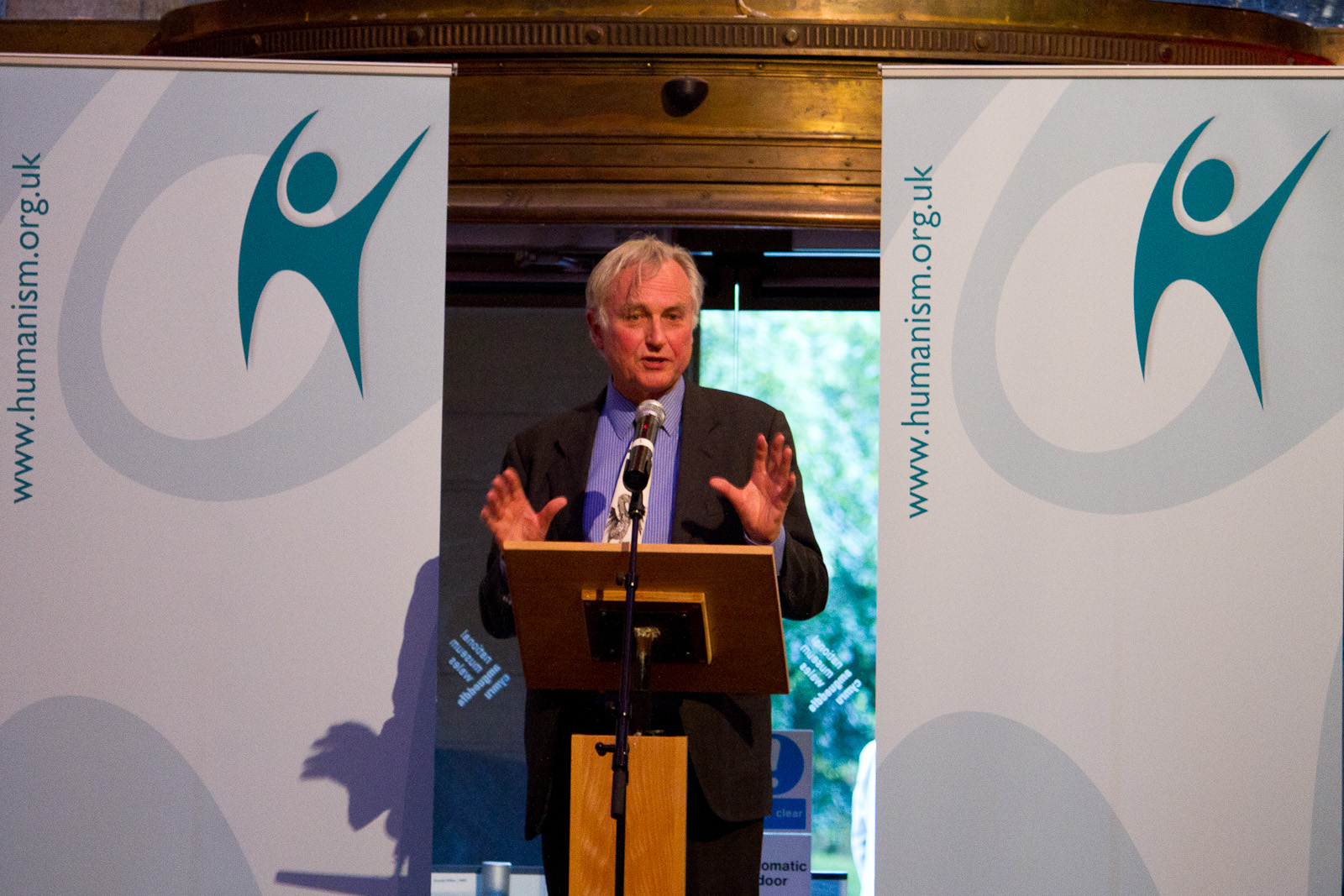
Dawkins accepting the Services to Humanism award at the British Humanist Association Annual Conference in 2012

Dawkins topped Prospect magazine's 2004 list of the top 100 public British intellectuals, as decided by the readers, receiving twice as many votes as the runner-up. He was shortlisted as a candidate in their 2008 follow-up poll. In a poll held by Prospect in 2013, Dawkins was voted the world's top thinker based on 65 names chosen by a largely US- and UK-based expert panel.

In 2005 the Hamburg-based Alfred Toepfer Foundation awarded him its annual Shakespeare Prize in recognition of his "concise and accessible presentation of scientific knowledge". He won the Lewis Thomas Prize for Writing about Science for 2006, as well as the Galaxy British Book Awards's Author of the Year Award for 2007. In the same year, he was listed by Time magazine as one of the 100 most influential people in the world, and was ranked 20th in The Daily Telegraph's 2007 list of 100 greatest living geniuses.

Since 2003 the Atheist Alliance International has awarded a prize during its annual conference, honouring an outstanding atheist whose work has done the most to raise public awareness of atheism during that year; it is known as the Richard Dawkins Award.

In February 2010 Dawkins was named to the Freedom From Religion Foundation's Honorary Board of distinguished achievers. In December 2024, Dawkins resigned from the board, along with Steven Pinker and Jerry Coyne, after the Foundation took down the article "Biology is not Bigotry" by Coyne which supported a biological, rather than a psychological, view of sex.

In 2012 a Sri Lankan team of ichthyologists headed by Rohan Pethiyagoda named a new genus of freshwater fish Dawkinsia in Dawkins's honour. (Members of this genus were formerly members of the genus Puntius).

The Royal Institution conducted a poll to determine the best science book ever. The Selfish Gene made the shortlist, along with Tom Stoppard's Arcadia, Konrad Lorenz's King Solomon's Ring and, in first place, Primo Levi's The Periodic Table.

Steven Pinker calls The Blind Watchmaker "Perhaps the best display of expository scientific prose of the twentieth century. It gave me the idea to try my hand at the genre in The Language Instinct."

Steven Weinberg included The Selfish Gene on his list of the 13 best science books for the general reader. Ian McEwan credits it with ushering in “a golden age of science writing.” He adds that “In the years since then, Dawkins' work might be seen as one extended invitation addressed to us non-scientists to enjoy science, to indulge ourselves at a feast of human ingenuity. Just as we can sit around the kitchen table and discuss operas, movies or novels without being composers, directors or novelists, so we can engage with this subject, one more sublime achievement of accumulated creativity. We can make it 'ours' just as we might the music of Bach or Bill Evans."

== Personal life ==
Dawkins has been married four times and has a daughter. On 19 August 1967 Dawkins married the ethologist Marian Stamp in the Protestant church in Annestown, County Waterford, Ireland; they divorced in 1984. On 1 June 1984 he married Eve Barham (1951–1999) in Oxford. They had one daughter prior to their divorce. In 1992 he married the actress Lalla Ward in Kensington and Chelsea. Dawkins met her through their mutual friend Douglas Adams, who had worked with her on the BBC television series Doctor Who. Dawkins and Ward separated in 2016 and they later described the separation as "entirely amicable". As of 2024, Dawkins is married to Jana Lenzová, an illustrator.

On 6 February 2016 Dawkins suffered a minor haemorrhagic stroke while at home. He reported later that year that he had almost completely recovered.

On Desert Island Discs, his choices included Bach, Schubert and Tchaikovsky. His book choice was The Jeeves Omnibus by P. G. Wodehouse.

== Media ==
=== Selected publications ===
- The Selfish Gene. 1976.
- The Extended Phenotype. 1982.
- The Blind Watchmaker. 1986.
- River Out of Eden. 1995.
- Climbing Mount Improbable. 1996.
- Unweaving the Rainbow. 1998.
- A Devil's Chaplain. 2003.
- The Ancestor's Tale. 2004. 2nd edition with Yan Wong, 2016
- The God Delusion. 2006.
- The Oxford Book of Modern Science Writing. 2008. (editor)
- The Greatest Show on Earth: The Evidence for Evolution. 2009.
- The Magic of Reality: How We Know What's Really True. 2011.
- An Appetite for Wonder. 2013. First volume of his memoirs.
- Brief Candle in the Dark. 2015. Second volume of his memoirs.
- Science in the Soul. 2017.
- Outgrowing God: A Beginner's Guide. 2019.
- Books Do Furnish a Life. 2021.
- Flights of Fancy: Defying Gravity by Design and Evolution. 2021.
- The Genetic Book of the Dead: A Darwinian Reverie. 2024.
- 42 Tales from Life: A Modern Bestiary. 2026.

=== Documentary films ===
- Nice Guys Finish First (1986)
- The Blind Watchmaker (1987)
- Growing Up in the Universe (1991)
- Break the Science Barrier (1996)
- The Atheism Tapes (2004)
- The Big Question (2005) – Part 3 of the TV series, titled "Why Are We Here?"
- The Root of All Evil? (2006)
- The Enemies of Reason (2007)
- The Genius of Charles Darwin (2008)
- Faith School Menace? (2010)
- Beautiful Minds (April 2012) – BBC4 documentary
- Sex, Death and the Meaning of Life (2012)
- The Unbelievers (2013)

=== Other appearances ===
Dawkins frequently appears on television news shows providing his political opinions, especially his views as an atheist. His numerous radio interviews and university speaking engagements often coincide with his book tours. He has also debated many religious figures. Dawkins has appeared in over a hundred film and television productions, including:

- Evolution (2001) - Dawkins discusses memes.
- Expelled: No Intelligence Allowed (2008) – as himself, presented as a leading scientific opponent of intelligent design in a film that contends that the mainstream science establishment suppresses academics who believe they see evidence of intelligent design in nature and who criticise evidence supporting Darwinian evolution
- Doctor Who: "The Stolen Earth" (2008) – as himself
- Inside Nature's Giants (2009–12) – as guest expert
- The Simpsons: "Black Eyed, Please" (2013) – appears in Ned Flanders's dream of Hell; provided voice as a demon version of himself
- Endless Forms Most Beautiful (2015) – by Nightwish: Finnish symphonic metal band Nightwish had Dawkins as a guest star on the album. He provides narration on two tracks: "Shudder Before the Beautiful", in which he opens the album with one of his own quotes, and "The Greatest Show on Earth", inspired by and named after his book The Greatest Show on Earth: The Evidence for Evolution, and in which he quotes On the Origin of Species by Charles Darwin. He subsequently performed his parts live with Nightwish on 19 December 2015 at the Wembley Arena in London; the concert was later released as a part of a live album/DVD titled Vehicle of Spirit.
- Intersect, a 2020 American thriller film in which Dawkins provided the voice of Q42/Computer.

Dawkins was parodied on the tenth season of the animated series South Park, depicted in the 2006 episodes "Go God Go" and "Go God Go XII".

== Selected bibliography ==
- Dawkins, Richard (1976). The Selfish Gene (1st ed.). United Kingdom: Oxford University Press. ISBN 978-0-19-857519-1. (2nd ed. 1989, 3rd ed. 2006, 4th ed. 2016)
- Dawkins, Richard (2003). A Devil's Chaplain. Weidenfeld & Nicolson (United Kingdom), Houghton Mifflin (United States). ISBN 978-0753817506.
- Dawkins, Richard (2006). The God Delusion. Transworld Publishers. ISBN 978-0-593-05548-9.
- Dawkins, Richard (2015). Brief Candle in the Dark: My Life in Science. Bantam Press. ISBN 978-0-59307-256-1.
- Dawkins, Richard (2016). The Ancestor's Tale (2nd ed.). Weidenfeld & Nicolson (United Kingdom). ISBN 978-0753817506.

== Notes ==
a. W. D. Hamilton influenced Dawkins and the influence can be seen throughout Dawkins's book The Selfish Gene. They became friends at Oxford and following Hamilton's death in 2000, Dawkins wrote his obituary and organised a secular memorial service.

b. The debate ended with the motion "That the doctrine of creation is more valid than the theory of evolution" being defeated by 198 votes to 115.

== Sources ==
- Dawkins, Richard (1989). The Selfish Gene (2nd ed.). United Kingdom: Oxford University Press. ISBN 978-0-19-286092-7.
