= A Devil's Chaplain =

Book by Richard Dawkins

- First edition cover
- Author: Richard Dawkins
- Language: English
- Subject: Evolutionary biology
- Published: 2003 (Boston: Houghton Mifflin)
- Publication place: United Kingdom
- Media type: Print
- Pages: 264
- ISBN: 0-618-33540-4
- OCLC: 52269209
- Dewey Decimal: 500 21
- LC Class: QH366.2 .D373 2003
- Preceded by: Unweaving the Rainbow
- Followed by: The Ancestor's Tale

A Devil's Chaplain: Reflections on Hope, Lies, Science, and Love is a 2003 book of selected essays and other writings by Richard Dawkins. Published five years after Dawkins's previous book Unweaving the Rainbow, it contains essays covering subjects including pseudoscience, genetic determinism, memetics, terrorism, religion and creationism. A section of the book is devoted to Dawkins' late adversary Stephen Jay Gould.

The book's title is a reference to a quotation of Charles Darwin, in a letter to J.D. Hooker dated 13 July 1856, made in reference to Darwin's lack of belief in how "a perfect world" was designed by God (and a reference to Reverend Robert Taylor): "What a book a devil's chaplain might write on the clumsy, wasteful, blundering low and horridly cruel works of nature!"

== Reception ==
Robin McKie reviewed the book for The Observer and stated that the book contained a mixture of touching essays and "the good, old knockabout stuff at which Dawkins excels".

== See also ==
- Argument from poor design
- Great Ape Project
