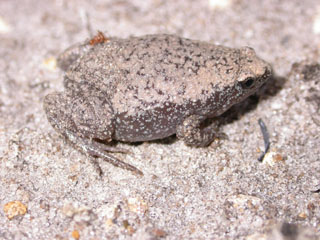
- Gastrophryne carolinensis

Scientific classification
- Kingdom: Animalia
- Phylum: Chordata
- Class: Amphibia
- Order: Anura
- Family: Microhylidae
- Subfamily: Gastrophryninae
- Genus: Gastrophryne; Fitzinger, 1843

Species
- 4, see text.

= Gastrophryne =

Genus of amphibians

Gastrophryne, the narrowmouth toads (also American narrowmouth toads, North American narrow-mouthed toads), is a genus of microhylid frogs found in the Americas between Honduras and southern United States. Its name means ‘belly-toad’, referring to its large belly, from the Ancient Greek gastēr (γαστήρ, ‘belly, stomach’) and phrunē (φρύνη, ‘toad’).

Gastrophryne is closely related to Hypopachus. Some species that were earlier placed in Gastrophryne were more closely related to Hypopachus, rendering the genus paraphyletic. This has been rectified by moving some species (Gastrophryne usta and Gastrophryne pictiventris) to Hypopachus.

Gastrophryne frogs were the first species to be recognized to be experiencing speciation by reinforcement and lead to the coining of the term reinforcement by W. Frank Blair in 1955; a concept proposed by Theodosius Dobzhansky decades earlier.

== Species ==
The currently recognized species are:

- Gastrophryne carolinensis (Holbrook, 1835) - eastern narrow-mouthed toad
- Gastrophryne elegans (Boulenger, 1882) - elegant narrow-mouthed toad
- Gastrophryne mazatlanensis (Taylor, 1943) - Mazatlan narrow-mouthed toad or Sinaloa narrow-mouthed toad
- Gastrophryne olivacea (Hallowell, 1856) - Great Plains narrow-mouthed toad

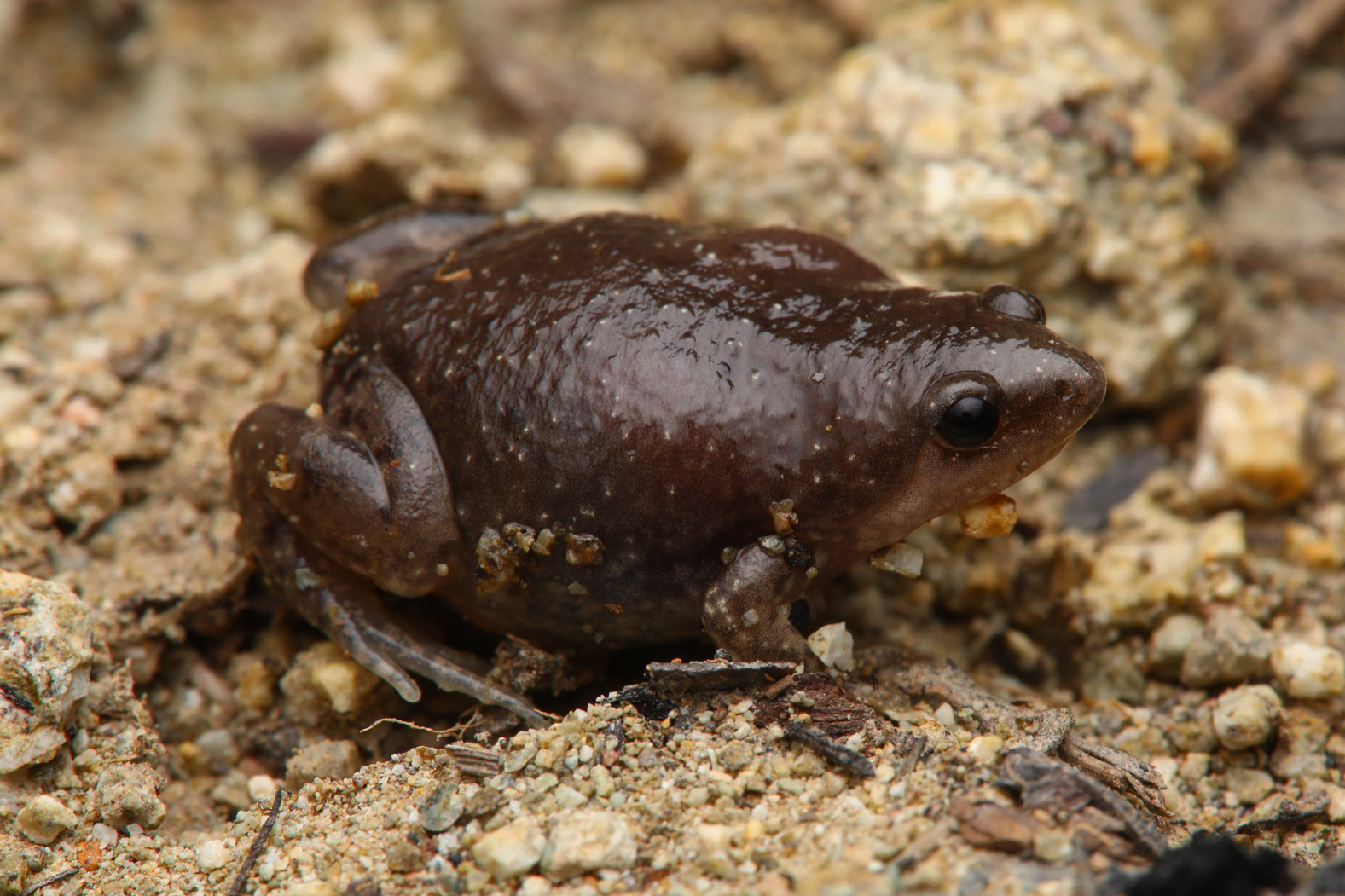
Mazatlan Narrow-mouthed Toad (Gastrophryne mazatlanensis), Arizona, USA (2021).

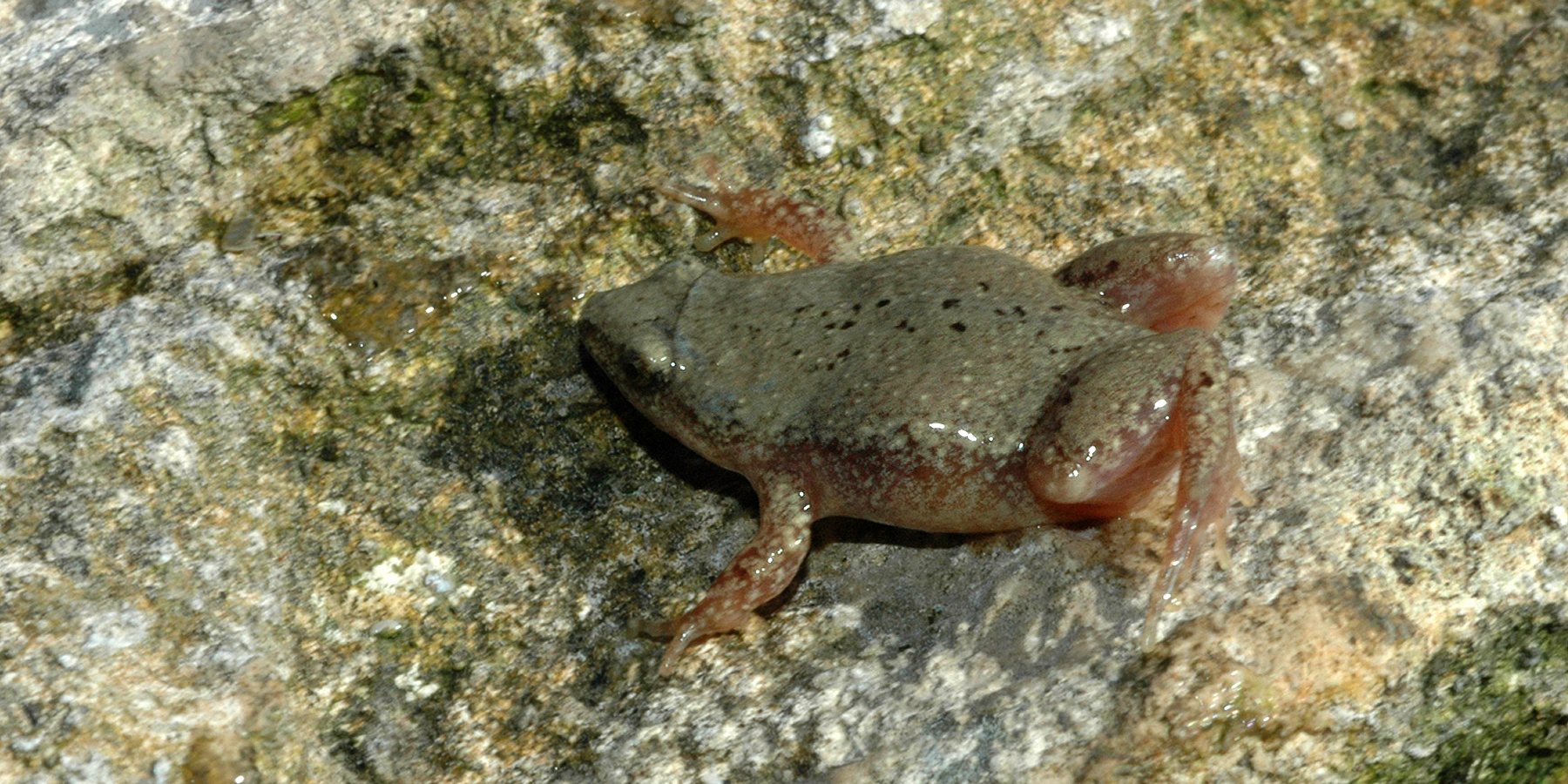
Western Narrow-mouthed Toad (Gastrophryne olivacea), Municipality of San Fernando, Tamaulipas, Mexico (19 March 2009).
