= Nicole Warren =

Nicole, Nichole, or Nicky Warren may refer to:

- Nicky Warren, coiner of "concestor" according to Richard Dawkins in The Ancestor's Tale
- Nicole Warren, character in the F. Scott Fitzgerald novel Tender Is the Night
- Nicky Warren, character in the television series The Inspector Lynley Mysteries
