= Bang Goes the Theory =

British television series (2009–2014)

- Genre: Factual, science and technology
- Presented by: Liz Bonnin; Jem Stansfield; Dallas Campbell; Dr. Yan Wong; Maggie Philbin
- Country of origin: United Kingdom
- Original language: English
- No. of series: 8
- No. of episodes: 64 – plus 3 specials

Production
- Producers: Ed Booth series 1,2,3 and 8. Paul King series 4,5,6,7.
- Production location: Sussex
- Editor: Dermot Caulfield
- Running time: 30 minutes
- Production companies: BBC; Open University

Original release
- Network: BBC HD; BBC One; BBC One HD
- Release: 27 July 2009 – 5 May 2014

Related
- Tomorrow's World

Bang Goes the Theory or Bang is a British television science magazine series, co-produced by the BBC and the Open University, that began on 27 July 2009 and ended on 5 May 2014 on BBC One. Originally presented by Liz Bonnin, Jem Stansfield, Dallas Campbell and Yan Wong, the show employed a hands-on approach to test scientific theory and demonstrate how science shapes our world. From series seven, Maggie Philbin replaced Dallas Campbell as a main presenter and Yan Wong no longer appeared and the programme was subsequently cancelled after just two more seasons.

== Production ==
=== Creation ===
The co-production between the BBC and the Open University was announced in June 2009 and was commissioned by Jay Hunt, controller of BBC One, for ten 30 minute episodes. It promises to "put scientific theory to the test" and examine "how science shapes the world around us". During the announcement, Hunt stated that the series "brings popular science back to the very heart of BBC One", referring to the long-running BBC series Tomorrow's World, which ran from 1965 to 2003 and was cancelled following falling ratings. Comparing Bang Goes the Theory to Tomorrow's World, series editor Dermot Caulfield said,

Rather than simply be a reporting vehicle on what's new in the world of science, we want to roll up our sleeves, stick our hands in the dirty gubbins of the engine and find out why, what, or where science is happening.

Dr. Stephen Serjeant (Reader in Cosmology at the OU), and Dr Ian Johnston (Lecturer in Engineering for the OU) were the two academic team leaders for the production, covering disciplines including geology, astrophysics, neuropsychology and zoology. The studio elements of the series were initially recorded in a building that housed the supersonic wind tunnel fans at RAE Bedford in Bedfordshire and was also the testing facility for the first prototype Harrier jump jet V/STOL aircraft. They were later recorded in the old linear accelerator building on the University of Sussex campus near Brighton, where Jem Stansfield has his workshop. As of Series 6 (from March 2012) no studio was used and linking sections were filmed on location.

To "inspire the audience to get hands on with science", the series was supported by a number of free events across the country organised by BBC Learning.

Over time, the programme moved from being an educational entertainment format in which short films were interspersed with "street science" demonstrations (mainly presented by Yan Wong) and stunts (mainly presented by Jem Stansfield), to a current affairs-style format. Distinct changes occurred in series 6, when each episode explored a single theme, the studio setting was dropped, several guest presenters appeared over the course of the series (one of whom, Maggie Philbin, subsequently joined the show as a regular presenter), and Jem Stansfield's stunts were phased out, with his attempt to build a pedal-powered flying machine (featured across two episodes) being the last such item to appear.

=== Presenters ===
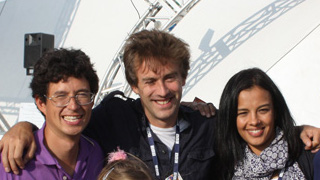
Yan Wong, Dallas Campbell & Liz Bonnin

Bang Goes the Theory was originally presented by Dallas Campbell (series 1–6); Liz Bonnin, a biochemist with a Masters in wild animal conservation; Jem Stansfield, an aeronautical engineer, inventor and designer of museum exhibits; and Yan Wong (co-author of The Ancestor's Tale), an Oxford-educated evolutionary biologist. Both Campbell and Wong left after series 6, and were replaced by Maggie Philbin, a science television presenter. From series 6 onwards, some segments were also fronted by one-off guest presenters. Maggie Philbin initially appeared as a guest presenter in series 6 before becoming a regular.

=== Live trailer ===
Ahead of the start of the series, BBC One aired a live three-minute trailer on 14 July 2009 before EastEnders. Described as a television first and emulating the Honda television advert Cog, it featured a continuing chain of scientific experiments, with one triggering the next and so on. The sequence included Bonnin using a bicycle to power a Van de Graaff generator and Stansfield then using the 250,000 volts generated to, among other things,

- light a Bunsen burner,
- inflate a large inflatable bunny,
- trigger a thermal switch,
- repel Wong away from Campbell along a track (using electromagnets attached to both presenters), and
- power a robotic hand

The sequence did not quite complete as expected: the bunny did not fully inflate and manual intervention was required to break an infrared beam to allow the experiment to continue; the rest of the experiment was executed without problems. Prior to the broadcast, over 10,000 people voted online for Wong to be propelled using magnetic forces. The live BBC 1 trailer was directed by John Rooney.

=== BBC One ident ===
From 27 July 2009 until 5 May 2014, Bang Goes The Theory was the only programme on BBC One to have its own ident. It depicted a group of people using bicycles to generate electricity to illuminate a ring of lights, into the centre of which the BBC One logo was superimposed.

== Live tour and roadshow ==
In 2010, a Bang roadshow happened, and in 2011 a Bang Live toured the UK with an exclusive live show and interactive tent.

=== Symphony of Bang Goes The Theory ===
Musician John Boswell created a song using clips from the Bang Goes The Theory shows and website. It features distortion of the presenters' words using pitch-correction software, over the top of original music, in the same vein as Boswell's Symphony of Science series. Although conceived originally as a web piece, the song is also used at the end of the Bang LIVE roadshows.

== Episodes ==
=== Series 1 ===
The first series consisted of ten episodes. At the end of the last episode, it was announced that the programme would return in March 2010. And also with the slogan "Putting science to the test" until Series 3.

| No. overall | No. in series | Topics | Original release date |
|---|---|---|---|
| 1 | 1 | Gait recognition, vortex rings, genetic engineering and an uncooked egg. | 27 July 2009 |
| 2 | 2 | Bugs as food, planet discovery, water powered jet pack | 3 August 2009 |
| 3 | 3 | Submarine rescue, plastics, vacuum gloves | 10 August 2009 |
| 4 | 4 | Magnetic cows, psychological priming, underwater fireworks, space race | 17 August 2009 |
| 5 | 5 | Thrills, non-lethal weapons, snakes and perception, squeaky voices | 24 August 2009 |
| 6 | 6 | Helicopters, Brain-Training, Space Entrepreneurs, Melting Glass in a Microwave | 7 September 2009 |
| 7 | 7 | Braking Systems, Origins of Speech, British Summers, Optical Illusions | 14 September 2009 |
| 8 | 8 | Microwaves, Nature v Nurture, Gyroscopes, Infrared | 21 September 2009 |
| 9 | 9 | Multitasking, Hot Ice, Spider Silk, Magic | 28 September 2009 |
| 10 | 10 | Toffee powered rocket, sense of smell, electricity and magnetism, fusion | 5 October 2009 |
| 11 | SP1 | Human Power Station (hour-long special) | 3 December 2009 |

=== Series 2 ===
The second series consisted of eight episodes, plus another hour-long special, starting on 15 March 2010. It was also broadcast on BBC HD.

| No. overall | No. in series | Topics | Original release date |
|---|---|---|---|
| 12 | 1 | Fire extinguisher go cart, global crude oil supply and exploration, and solving crimes with Forensic science. | 15 March 2010 |
| 13 | 2 | Human g-force tolerance, Sport Relief, the atom, and snorkel length. | 22 March 2010 |
| 14 | 3 | Darwin's dilemma, Human powered hydrofoil, Lie detectors | 29 March 2010 |
| 15 | 4 | Steel making, Eternal life, Dolphin flipper on a human swimmer | 12 April 2010 |
| 16 | SP2 | Can You Train Your Brain? (hour-long special) | 14 April 2010 |
| 17 | 5 | Volcanic ash, Power stations, Skiing | 19 April 2010 |
| 18 | 6 | Happiness, Burying carbon dioxide, Avalanches | 26 April 2010 |
| 19 | 7 | Horsepower, Free diving, Anti-matter | 3 May 2010 |
| 20 | 8 | Smell, Coffee fueled car, Origins of life | 10 May 2010 |

=== Series 3 ===
The third series consisted of six episodes, starting on 8 September 2010. It was also broadcast on BBC HD.

| No. overall | No. in series | Topics | Original release date |
|---|---|---|---|
| 21 | 1 | Gulf of Mexico oil spill and Einstein's theory of relativity. | 8 September 2010 |
| 22 | 2 | Sunburn, psychological priming and shapes of wheels. | 15 September 2010 |
| 23 | 3 | Jet lag, the size of the solar system and a square-wheeled motorbike (continued from previous episode). | 22 September 2010 |
| 24 | 4 | The origin of weather and seasons, wave power (involving the Pelamis Wave Energy Converter) and the theory of evolution. | 29 September 2010 |
| 25 | 5 | The 2010 eruptions of Eyjafjallajökull in Iceland, gambling in Las Vegas and solar furnaces. | 6 October 2010 |
| 26 | 6 | A (failed) recreation of Project Habakkuk, making a boat from 'Pykrete', fibre-reinforced ice. | 13 October 2010 |

=== Series 4 ===
The fourth series commenced with an hour-long special, starting on 10 March 2011. It was also broadcast on BBC HD, and also with the slogan "Revealing your world with a bang" until Series 5. The slogan "Revealing your world through science" was used on Japan Earthquake special episode.

| No. overall | No. in series | Topics | Original release date |
|---|---|---|---|
| 27 | SP3 | Bang Goes The Winter Weather (hour-long special) | 10 March 2011 |
| 28 | 1 | Japan Earthquake Special | 14 March 2011 |
| 29 | 2 | In vitro fertilization and 360 degrees on a playground swing. | 21 March 2011 |
| 30 | 3 | A 1000mph car, stuff sticky, and homemade glues. | 28 March 2011 |
| 31 | 4 | Calories and antibiotics. | 4 April 2011 |
| 32 | 5 | Lasers, the speed of light, and citizen science. | 11 April 2011 |
| 33 | 6 | Genetically modified foods, House dust mite vs Asthma and allergies, and shattering glass with music. | 18 April 2011 |
| 34 | 7 | A Royal Wedding theme and Liz uses Genetic genealogy to track her family tree right back to the earliest humans. | 25 April 2011 |
| 35 | 8 | The future of Recycling and how GPS works. | 2 May 2011 |

=== Series 5 ===
The fifth series began airing on 15 August 2011 on BBC One and in HD on BBC One HD.

| No. overall | No. in series | Topics | Original release date |
|---|---|---|---|
| 36 | 1 | Making Diamonds, the science of Popcorn and curing Cancer. | 15 August 2011 |
| 37 | 2 | Liz hits the beach with the RNLI to experience the power of rip currents. | 22 August 2011 |
| 38 | 3 | Jem witnesses the awesome power of rockets with the Bloodhound land speed record project. | 29 August 2011 |
| 39 | 4 | Topics include new stem-cell research and the Nocebo effect. | 5 September 2011 |
| 40 | 5 | Bedbugs, statistics, visit to Caltech. | 12 September 2011 |
| 41 | 6 | Causes of tooth decay and gum disease, why food refreezing should be avoided, sleeping problems caused by electric lights. | 19 September 2011 |
| 42 | 7 | Helium shortage, public knowledge about radiation, airport security technologies. | 26 September 2011 |
| 43 | 8 | Nuclear reactor, clean-up of nuclear waste, radiation influence on the human body. | 3 October 2011 |

=== Series 6 ===
The sixth series began airing on 12 March 2012 on BBC One and in HD on BBC One HD, in England and Scotland. It is shown a day later, on BBC Two in Northern Ireland and Wales.

| No. overall | No. in series | Topics | Original release date |
|---|---|---|---|
| 44 | 1 | "Fuel for Free". The team investigates why petrol costs so much, and whether we can use science to make fuel for free. Liz experiences life on an oil rig, Jem and Dallas compete to make their own DIY fuel alternatives, and Jem discovers the link between fossil fuels and a recent earthquake in Lancashire. | 12 March 2012 |
| 45 | 2 | "Is Life Too Loud?". The team asks whether modern life is damaging our ears. Dallas explores how safety-conscious scientists are putting the noise back into driving, Liz learns to like the sound of being sick, and Jem sets out to record the sound of a centipede's footsteps. | 19 March 2012 |
| 46 | 3 | "Cyber Security". Liz finds out how safe digital storage formats such as DVDs and memory sticks are, and whether the Cloud answers all our problems. Dallas and Jem see what it takes to properly wipe your computer memory, and Maggie Philbin revisits a Tomorrow's World feature on phone security after nearly 30 years, investigating how hackers can access your smartphone. | 26 March 2012 |
| 47 | 4 | Dallas finds out how crowds can co-operate subconsciously, Liz sees how architects control the flow of crowds, and Jem meets scientists trying to understand how crush injuries can occur. Plus, 80s number cruncher, Johnny Ball, demonstrates just how biologists measure population size. | 2 April 2012 |
| 48 | 5 | Wireless energy transfer, Wi-Fi health concerns. | 16 April 2012 |
| 49 | 6 | Jem dreams of flying under his own power by pedalling a homemade plane into the air. | 23 April 2012 |
| 50 | 7 | Jem heads for his workshop to build a solution to traffic jams: a man-powered aeroplane. | 30 April 2012 |
| 51 | 8 | Philippa Forrester takes her pet to a lab to find out how dogs can be good for people's health. | 14 May 2012 |

=== Series 7 ===
The seventh series began airing on 4 March 2013 on BBC One and in HD on BBC One HD, in England, at the same time but on BBC Two in Scotland, and a day later on BBC Two in Northern Ireland and Wales.

| No. overall | No. in series | Topics | Original release date |
|---|---|---|---|
| 52 | 1 | The Bang team reveal the science behind plastics. | 4 March 2013 |
| 53 | 2 | Liz explains bacterial resistance. Maggie finds out about catching infections inside an aeroplane, and reveals a new technique for prescribing antibiotics. Jem heads to a scrapyard to demonstrate the difference between viruses and bacteria. | 11 March 2013 |
| 54 | 3 | The team investigate whether sugar deserves its bad health reputation. | 18 March 2013 |
| 55 | 4 | Road safety, heart attacks in young people, and a burns dressing that could reduce the risk of scarring. | 25 March 2013 |
| 56 | 5 | How much do we really know about what's on our dinner plate? | 8 April 2013 |
| 57 | 6 | The team report on how scientists and engineers are working to reduce the strain on Britain's ageing infrastructure. | 15 April 2013 |
| 58 | 7 | Maggie puts online diagnosis tools to the test against a real doctor, and reveals how personalised medicine can help young people with asthma. Jem checks out the latest self-monitoring gadgets. Liz finds out about a new technique that can correct a rare genetic condition that causes blindness. | 22 April 2013 |
| 59 | 8 | The team investigate air pollution. | 29 April 2013 |

=== Series 8 ===
The eighth and final series began airing on 10 March 2014 on BBC One and in HD on BBC One HD, in England and Scotland. Jem Stansfield did not appear in episodes 4, 6, 7 and 8 but was still credited as "Engineering consultant", and replaced by Sir Terry Wogan, Charlie Dimmock, and Dr. Chris van Tulleken as guest host.

| No. overall | No. in series | Topics | Original release date |
|---|---|---|---|
| 60 | 1 | Energy – The team investigate how close Britain might get to running out of electricity. | 10 March 2014 |
| 61 | 2 | Cancer – Liz explains how cells turn cancerous, Jem builds his own radiotherapy gun, Maggie looks at the latest drugs, and Tommy Walsh looks into screening for bowel cancer. | 17 March 2014 |
| 62 | 3 | Big Data – Liz looks at how big data monitors Rolls-Royce jet engines, Jem creates a low-tech computer and storage system, and Maggie examines the dark side of big data: privacy. | 24 March 2014 |
| 63 | 4 | Ageing – The team look at how our bodies change as we get older. Sir Terry Wogan investigates whether any drugs are available which could reduce the risk of dementia. | 31 March 2014 |
| 64 | 5 | Flu – Jem explains flu on a cellular level, Liz witnesses vaccines being made and Maggie visits a flu research lab. | 7 April 2014 |
| 65 | 6 | Flooding – Did global warming play a part in the recent floods? Maggie investigates the threat of storm surge, Liz looks at how nature can 'slow the flow' and Charlie Dimmock considers how urban flash floods might be linked to patios and decking. | 14 April 2014 |
| 66 | 7 | Trains – The team report on how engineers are keeping Britain's ageing rail system on track. | 28 April 2014 |
| 67 | 8 | Disaster Relief – Maggie visits the Zaatari refugee camp, Liz reports on cholera, and the team are joined by Dr. Chris van Tulleken, maker of a peanut-based paste that has saved tens of thousands of famine victims. | 5 May 2014 |

== Controversy ==
=== Episode on nuclear power found 'misleading' by BBC Trust ===
The 8th episode of series 5 looking at nuclear power was found to be 'not accurate' and 'misleading' by the Ethical Standards Committee of the BBC Trust. The review of the episode was prompted by a complaint registered by 50 co-signatories, which included MPs and nuclear experts.

=== Jem Stansfield wins damages against the BBC ===
On 1 October 2021, ex-presenter Jem Stansfield won £1.6m in damages for suffering and loss of earnings as a result of injuries he sustained while acting as a "human crash-test" dummy in 2013. The judge commented "I must say that I find it astonishing that anyone thought that this exercise was a sensible idea. On his own account to camera, the claimant was simulating a road traffic collision of the sort that commonly causes injury. It might be thought that someone of his intelligence and scientific background might have appreciated the risk."

== DVD releases ==
A DVD set containing the first two series of Bang Goes the Theory was issued in 2010. A second DVD set containing Series 3 and 4 of Bang Goes the Theory was issued in November 2011. None of the subsequent series has been issued on DVD.
