= The Ancestor's Tale =

2004 book on evolution by Richard Dawkins & Yan Wong

The Ancestor's Tale: A Pilgrimage to the Dawn of Life
- First edition (UK)
- Author: Richard Dawkins & Yan Wong
- Language: English
- Subject: Evolutionary biology
- Publisher: Houghton Mifflin (US); Weidenfeld & Nicolson (UK)
- Publication date: 1st edition 2004, 2nd edition 2016
- Publication place: United Kingdom
- Media type: Print
- Pages: 673 pages in 1st edition and expanded to 800 pages in 2nd ed.
- ISBN: 978-0544859937
- OCLC: 1062329664
- Dewey Decimal: 576.8 22
- LC Class: QH361 .D39 2004
- Preceded by: A Devil's Chaplain
- Followed by: The God Delusion

The Ancestor's Tale: A Pilgrimage to the Dawn of Life is a popular science book by the evolutionary biologists Richard Dawkins and Yan Wong. It retraces the history of life in reverse chronological order: A growing band of species meet their most recent common ancestors (concestors) at 40 rendezvous points. First published in 2004, it was updated in 2016 to reflect recent discoveries. Many reviewers described it as Dawkins's magnum opus.

== Background ==
The book is patterned on Geoffrey Chaucer's The Canterbury Tales, in which pilgrims en route to Canterbury converge with other travelers and tell tales. Here, species convene with their common ancestors, and "Canterbury" is the origin of life.

The epigraph is from Mark Twain: "History doesn't repeat itself, but it rhymes." The authors argue that "Evolution rhymes, patterns occur. And this doesn't just happen to be so. It is so for well-understood reasons: Darwinian reasons, mostly, for unlike human history or even physics, biology already has its grand unifying theory." They note that no living species is ancestral to any other, but that all share a common ancestor. Evidence for this fact is that the code for translating genes into proteins is universal. Since genes and proteins are more similar in closely related species, they act as molecular clocks that show us when species split. The authors use concestor, coined by Nicky Warren, to describe the most recent common ancestor at each rendezvous point. The pilgrimage proceeds through extant species, with the exception of early hominids like Homo habilis, and species like the dodo, whose DNA is available to us.

The book was revised in 2016. Notably, "The Denisovan's Tale", about paleogenetics, replaces "The Neanderthal's Tale" and "The Sloth's Tale", about biogeography, replaces "The Armadillo's Tale". "The Galápagos Finch's Tale", about natural selection, includes new research on the genetics of Darwin's finches, and the conclusion of "The Elephant Bird's Tale" has been updated. The phylogenetic trees in the second edition are based on OneZoom evolutionary mapping software. In 2005, on a pilgrimage to the Galápagos, Dawkins wrote three new tales. The third is reprinted in the second edition.

== Tales ==
=== All Humankind ===
Rendezvous point	New Pilgrim	Tale	
		All Humankind	The Tasmanian's Tale is about the identical ancestors point, from which all living people trace exactly the same set of ancestors. The authors look at the small, isolated population of Tasmania and the last surviving native Tasmanian, Truganini. They point out that she and all humans alive today share a recent common ancestor.
		All Humankind	The Farmer's Tale is about the Neolithic Revolution. Agriculture began when humans domesticated plants and animals through artificial selection.
		All Humankind	The Cro-Magnon's Tale is about cultural evolution. The authors note that “Archaeology suggests that something very special began to happen to our species around 50,000 years ago.” After Jared Diamond, they call this the Great Leap Forward.

=== Archaic Homo sapiens ===
Rendezvous point	New Pilgrim	Tale	
		Archaic Homo sapiens	Eve's Tale is about coalescent theory. The authors introduce mitochondrial DNA, which is inherited from the mother and allows us to trace matrilineal ancestry (in humans, to Mitochondrial Eve). In mammals, the Y-chromosome is inherited from the father, and allows us to trace patrilineal ancestry (in humans, to Y-chromosomal Adam.) They introduce haplotypes.
		Archaic Homo sapiens	The Denisovan’s Tale is about paleogenetics, specifically Svante Pääbo’s work on Neanderthals and the sequencing of mitochondrial Denisovan DNA in 2009.
		Archaic Homo sapiens	The Ergast's Tale is about paleontology, how fossils form and how fortunate we are that they exist. They discuss significant fossils in human evolution, from Kamoya Kimeu’s discovery of Turkana Boy to Mary Leakey’s discovery of the Laetoli footprints.
		Archaic Homo sapiens	The Handyman's Tale is about brain-body mass ratio, and how Homo habilis acquired a high one. The authors introduce logarithmic scale and scatterplot, tools they return to.
		Archaic Homo sapiens	Ardi's Tale is about how hominids evolved bipedalism, citing work by Jonathan Kingdon.

=== Nonhuman Primates ===
Rendezvous point	Time	New Pilgrim	Tale
1	6 mya	Chimpanzees	The Chimpanzee's Tale is about comparative genomics, specifically the comparison of human and chimpanzee genomes. The authors note that human chromosome 2 formed from a recent fusion, which is why the other Great Apes have 24 pairs of chromosomes and humans have 23. The Bonobo's Tale is about incomplete lineage sorting.
2	7 mya	Gorillas	The Gorilla's Tale is about human's changing attitude towards the great apes, ending with a discussion on racism, speciesism and the Great Ape Project.
3	14 mya	Orangutans (Pongo)	The Orangutan's Tale is about parsimony and its use in cladogram construction. They discuss the possibility that the ancestors of the Great Apes were in Asia, where one line stayed and gave rise to Orangutans, where they are found today (Orang utan is Malay for "man of the forest".) The other line went to Africa and gave rise to Gorillas, Chimpanzees and humans. They find this more parsimonious than the alternative.
4	18 mya	Gibbons (Hylobatidae)	The Gibbon's Tale is about phylogenetics. The authors note that the genetic code is degenerate. As a result, “some DNA codes are synonymous: they specify exactly the same amino acid.” Synonymous substitutions are invisible to evolution but not to biologists. Since they are not subject to selection, they show greater variation between species. The same is true of pseudogenes. Coding regions are conserved sequences. Rare genomic changes are unlikely to have arisen independently, and are likely due to common descent.
5	25 mya	Old World monkeys (Cercopithecidae)	Old World monkeys, being in the same Catarrhini clade as apes, are closer cousins to apes than to New World monkeys. Old World monkeys are sometimes called the 'tailed apes'. It is not known if the actual common ancestor had a tail or not.
6	40 mya	New World monkeys (Platyrrhini)	The Howler Monkey’s Tale is about gene duplication and how it creates new genes. When a gene is copied, it can evolve a new function. This happened in the evolution of color vision in primates. Old World Primates (including humans) are trichromats, with three opsins (red, green and blue), each coded for by a specific gene. The red and green opsin genes are similar, and adjacent on the X chromosome. They are derived from a recent duplication. Mutations that improved the function of the new gene were selected for until the opsin could detect a different wavelength. Most New World monkeys are dichromats, with either red or green genes on the X chromosome. In some species, both red and green alleles are present in the population as a polymorphism. In Howler monkeys, both genes were put on the X chromosome through a translocation. As often happens in evolution, the same end was reached via different means.
7	60 mya	Tarsiers	The Tarsier's Tale is about its enormous eyes. Unlike most nocturnal mammals, they lack a tapetum lucidum to reflect light from the back of the eye for a second exposure on the retina. The ancestor of the tarsier was a diurnal animal which lost the tapetum lucidum.
8	65 mya	Lemurs and Bushbabies	The Aye-Aye's Tale is about island ecology. In Madagascar, a small strepsirrhine founding population evolved to fill available niches. Today, it is home to as many as one hundred species of lemur. Lemurs, kin to lorises and pottos, are found only on this island. Madagascar is also home to six of the world’s eight species of baobabs. With a landmass 1/1000 of Earth's total land area, it accounts for 4% of all species of flora and fauna.

=== Non-primate mammals ===
Rendezvous point	Time	New Pilgrim	Tale
9	70 mya	Colugos	The Colugo's Tale is about how genetic evidence has made people rethink existing phylogenies. A case in point: in the earlier edition, colugos and treeshrews joined humans at the same point. But genetic evidence from indels suggests that these creatures (colloquially called “flying lemurs” due to their patagium) are closer cousins to primates than to treeshrews.
10	70 mya	Treeshrews	Treeshrews look like squirrels, but the resemblance is superficial.
11	75 mya	Rodents and Rabbitkind (Glires, Supraprimates or euarchontoglires)	Rodents outnumber all other mammals by individuals and have been carried to every corner of the earth. They include dormice, pikas, squirrels.
11	75 mya	Rodents and Rabbitkind (Glires, Supraprimates or euarchontoglires)	The Mouse's Tale is about developmental biology. Mice and humans have about the same number of genes, many of them the same. The developmental differences are due to differences in gene expression. Some genes code for transcription factors that regulate the expression of other genes. Borrowing from Matt Ridley, the authors liken genes to words, which can be put together in very different ways. From a similar vocabulary, very different books can be written. From a similar set of genes, very different organisms can be made.
11	75 mya	Rodents and Rabbitkind (Glires, Supraprimates or euarchontoglires)	The Beaver's Tale is about Dawkins's concept of The Extended Phenotype. An organism's phenotype is typically defined as its physical traits, coded for by its genotype. But beavers are hard-wired by evolution to build dams, so the dam could be considered an extension of its phenotype (so, by extension, could the beaver lake.)
12	85 mya	Laurasiatheres	An extremely diverse group of 2,000 species join here, including Carnivora (dogs, cats, bears and seals), Perissodactyla (horses, zebras, tapirs and rhinos), Cetartiodactyla (deer, giraffes, cattle and pigs), Chiroptera (bats), Insectivora (moles and shrews). They are grouped together based on similar gene sequences and are named for the northern super-continent of Laurasia, where they evolved.
12	85 mya	Laurasiatheres	The Hippo's Tale is about cetacean evolution. All cetaceans, including whales, dolphins and porpoises, are descendants of land-living mammals of the Artiodactyl order, as evidenced by their vestigial pelvic and leg bones, by fossils such as Pakicetus and Basilosaurus and the fact that they have to come to the surface to breathe air. Like all mammals, they produce milk and, like most mammals, live young. The surprise is that whales are the closest living relatives of hippos. So close is the molecular resemblance that whales are now grouped with hippos as Cetartiodactyla.
12	85 mya	Laurasiatheres	The Seal's Tale is about Fisher's principle. A sex ratio of 50:50 (males to females) is found in most animals. R. A. Fisher found that if females are less common than males, females will have a reproductive advantage. A tendency to produce females will be favored, until females are more common. The same is true if the sexes are reversed. A 50:50 ratio is evolutionarily stable. In a harem-based (polygynous) system such as that of elephant seals, where 4 per cent of males account for 88 per cent of all copulations, the 50:50 sex ratio seems to produce an excess of males. Fisher would note that, while a male is less likely to reproduce, if he does, he will do so in spades. The 50:50 ratio is still evolutionarily stable.
13	90 mya	Xenarthrans and Afrotheres	Xenarthrans (from the Greek for "strange joint") include sloths, anteaters and armadillos. Afrotheres include elephants, elephant shrews, dugongs, manatees, hyraxes and aardvarks. Afrotheres are found in Africa and Xenarthrans in the Americas, for reasons that will become clear.
13	90 mya	Xenarthrans and Afrotheres	The Sloth's Tale is about biogeography. Charles Darwin and Alfred Russel Wallace, who independently discovered the engine of evolution, recognized patterns in the geographic distribution of species. Darwin, during the Voyage of the Beagle, wondered: Why do oceanic islands have endemic species of birds but not mammals? (Bats are the exception that proves the rule.) Why are those species so similar to those on the nearest mainland? Why are some species specific to certain continents? Why are sloths (including ground sloths, fossils of which Darwin found) only in the Americas? These patterns occur the world over, as Wallace found in the Malay Archipelago. Alfred Wegener provided the missing pieces of the puzzle with his theory of continental drift, the basis of plate tectonics. Evidence comes from seafloor spreading. Moving away from a mid-ocean ridge in either direction, the rocks get older in predictable patterns. Multiple independent lines of evidence point to the Southern continents having split from the ancient super-continent Gondwana. After South America split from Gondwana, the Xenarthrans evolved in what G. G. Simpson called “splendid isolation”. The isolation ended with the formation of the Isthmus of Panama. Species crossed it in both directions in the Great American Interchange. This was worked out by Wallace. In Indonesia, he discovered the line that bears his name.
14	160 mya	Marsupials	Placental mammals meet the marsupials (from the Latin marsupium, or pouch, which they use to carry young.) Most modern marsupials are found in Australia and New Guinea, with some in South America and a single species (Didelphis virginiana) north of Mexico. Dromiciops gliroides is more closely related to Australian marsupials than to its peers in South America. Marsupials evolved in South America and crossed the Antarctic land bridge to Australia. After Australia split from Gondwana, it was an ark carrying marsupials. In this isolated environment, many marsupials evolved to fill the niches occupied by placental mammals on other continents.
14	160 mya	Marsupials	The Marsupial Mole's Tale is about convergent evolution. The marsupial mole is not a mole, but resembles one as it has evolved to fill a similar niche. Many Australian marsupials are doppelgängers of placental mammals on other continents. There are marsupials mirroring mice (Antechinus), flying squirrels (Petaurus breviceps and Petaurus gracilis), rabbits (Macrotis), anteaters (the numbat), groundhogs (the wombat) and wolves (the Thylacine.) Kangaroos fill the same ecological niche as mammals on other continents. Evolution is sufficiently powerful to shape analogous adaptations in similar environments, even in species separated in time and space.
15	180 mya	Monotremes	There are three extant genera of monotremes (Greek, "single hole"): the short-beaked echidna (found throughout Australia and New Guinea), the long-beaked echidna (in New Guinea) and the platypus (in Eastern Australia and Tasmania). They have mammalian features such as warm-bloodedness, hair and mammary glands. The middle ear is mammalian, with three ossicles, but the cochlea is less coiled than in other mammals. They are clearly reptilian in other respects, notably a cloaca which is used to lay eggs.
15	180 mya	Monotremes	The Duckbill's Tale is about how seemingly “primitive” animals have evolved complex adaptations. The platypus, reptilian in some respects, has had precisely the same time to evolve as other mammals, even if it does not resemble our concestor 15. On its large bill, it has evolved a highly developed form of electroreception served by 40,000 electric sensors and 60,000 mechanical push rods, which aid it in search of prey. In humans, the brain dedicates a disproportionally large fraction of cells to the two hands, as illustrated by the Penfield homunculus. When the same somatotopic map is drawn for the platypus brain, the bill dominates. An aside is “What the Star-Nosed Mole Said to the Duck-Billed Platypus”. The mole is not a monotreme, but its sensory apparatus is at least as peculiar as the platypus’s.

=== Non-mammal chordates ===
Rendezvous point	Time	New Pilgrim	Tale
16	320 mya	Sauropsids	
16	320 mya	Sauropsids	The Lava Lizard's Tale is about geology. Dawkins describes his pilgrimage to the Galápagos island of Santiago, visited by Darwin in 1835. One day late in his century, a volcano erupted there. The day's events are written in the island’s rocks. Dawkins describes the archipelago's unique flora and fauna, and the camouflage used by the lava lizard.
16	320 mya	Sauropsids	The Galápagos Finch’s Tale is about natural selection and how it can produce rapid evolutionary change, as Peter and Rosemary Grant found through their long-term study of Darwin’s finches. In 1977, drought struck Daphne Major, creating selective pressure for longer beaks capable of cracking the tough seeds of Tribulus. The finches evolved accordingly. In 1982-1983, El Niño brought floods to Daphne Major. The selective pressure changed to favor smaller beaks that could eat the smaller seeds of Cacabus. The finches again evolved accordingly. In 2015, the Grants, along with researchers at Uppsala University, “located a number of DNA regions that co-varied with beak shape and homed in on a gene called ALX1… The ALX1 gene tree, deduced from Galápagos finch populations, shows branching patterns indicative of natural selection.”
16	320 mya	Sauropsids	The Peacock's Tale is about sexual selection and how it can produce rapid evolutionary change. The peacock's tail evolved because generations of peahens preferred plumage. Fisher found that genes making males have a trait are linked to genes for females preferring that same trait, leading to Fisherian runaway.
16	320 mya	Sauropsids	The Dodo’s Tale is about island biogeography. Many birds colonizing oceanic islands convergently evolve flightlessness. Since these islands lack predators, wings aren’t selected for and become vestigial. This happens even if wings would be useful in the future, which was sadly true in the case of the dodo, as wings would have proved useful when men arrived in Mauritius with clubs. Alan Cooper has analyzed mitochondrial dodo DNA, and found they were related to pigeons.
16	320 mya	Sauropsids	The Elephant Bird's Tale is about island gigantism. Many species colonizing oceanic islands convergenntly evolve rapidly in size, as seen in the extinct Elephant Bird of Madagascar and the moa of New Zealand. In the first edition, Dawkins speculated that extant ratites (rheas of South America, emus of Australia, cassowaries of Australia and New Guinea, kiwis of New Zealand and ostriches, now of Africa) convergently evolved flightlessness rather than inheriting it through a single flightless ancestor. Molecular evidence, from Cooper’s study of Elephant Bird DNA, confirms this.
17	340 mya	Amphibians	Mammals and reptiles (the amniotes) join the amphibians (Greek, "dual lives", as they can live in or out of water) to meet the ancestor of all tetrapods (Greek, "four feet"). Amphibians include frogs, toads, salamanders, newts and caecilians. While amniotes either give live births or lay waterproof eggs, amphibians retain the ancestral practise of laying eggs in water. Unlike the waterproof skin of amniotes, amphibian skin allows body water to evaporate through it, restricting amphibians to land areas with access to fresh water. Saltwater is toxic to frogspawn, which is why frogs are seldom found on oceanic islands. The concestor probably was probably pentadactyl (Greek, "five digits").
17	340 mya	Amphibians	The Salamander's Tale is about speciation, which occurs when gene flow is disrupted. When a species inhabits a geographic ring, genes can flow around it. Robert C. Stebbins studied the Ensatina salamanders, which inhabit a ring surrounding California’s Central Valley. Around the ring, neighbouring populations of Ensatina can interbreed. But the plain Ensatina eschscholtzii on the western end cannot interbreed with the blotched Ensatina klauberi on the eastern end. Moving westward round the ring, populations become progressively plainer until they resemble Ensatina eschscholtzii. Moving eastward, populations gradually become more blotched until they resemble Ensatina klauberi. Such ring species show in space what happens in time.
17	340 mya	Amphibians	The Narrowmouth's Tale is about parapatric speciation. Gastrophryne olivacea (Great Plains narrow-mouth toad) and Gastrophryne carolinensis (eastern narrow-mouth toad) are closely related. The former species has adapted to the western United States, the latter the eastern. But their ranges meet in the middle. It is there that their mating calls differ most sharply. Theodosius Dobzhansky theorized that this was due to reinforcement: natural selection favours adaptations that discourage interbreeding. This causes character displacement, where two related species differ more in areas where they overlap.
17	340 mya	Amphibians	The Axolotl's Tale is about metamorphosis, by which larvae change into dramatically different adult forms for reproduction. A frog has genes for making a tadpole, as John Gurdon showed in 1962 by transplanting the nucleus of an adult frog into an enucleated cell, which developed into a tadpole. This work won him the Nobel Prize in Physiology or Medicine in 2012. Most salamanders undergo metamorphosis, passing through a larval stage with “long, feathery external gills” which they lose as adults. Axolotls exhibit pedomorphosis, a process which enables juveniles to become sexually mature without developing into their usual adult forms. Axolotls remain aquatic and retain the gills. Julian Huxley found that with a treatment of thyroxine, it is possible to induce an axolotl to develop into a mature salamander.
18	415 mya	Lungfish (Dipnoi)	
18	415 mya	Lungfish (Dipnoi)	The Lungfish's Tale is about tetrapod evolution. The authors trace transitional fossils documenting this transformation: Eusthenopteron, Panderichthys, Tiktaalik, Acanthostega and Ichthyostega. They speculate about selection pressures that drove fish to land. For many years, the favored idea was Alfred Romer's, that fish who could move from a drying pond to a deeper one had an advantage. Among the six extant species of lungfish, the South American lungfish (Lepidosiren paradoxa) and four species of African lungfish (in the genus Protopterus) do something similar today, using their lungs to make it through dry seasons. (The Australian lungfish, Neoceratodus forsteri, inhabits weedy waters and uses its lung to supplement its gills.) But the Devonian does not seem to have been defined by drought, and Romer’s idea has fallen out of favor. But Steven Balbus notes that Earth’s moon was once much closer, and its tidal forces much stronger. It is possible that this concestor was moving from tide pool to tide pool. (There are other reasons to come to land. Mudskippers feed on land, and some spend more time on land than in water). The lungfish’s eponymous organ is likely homologous to ours, inherited from concestor 18.
19	420 mya	Coelacanths (Latimeria)	The Coelacanth's Tale is about so-called “living fossils”, of which the coelacanth is a celebrated example. The authors describe its discovery by Marjorie Courtenay-Latimer. However, even species that show little phenotypic change undergo molecular evolution, for reasons seen later in the pilgrimage.
20	430 mya	Ray-Finned Fish (Actinopterygii)	The current pilgrimage consisting of all descendants of lobe-finned fish is joined by the equally successful ray-finned fishes which includes sturgeon, paddlefish, eel, herring, carp, salmon, trout, seahorse, cod, etc. to meet concestor 19, the bony fish. Of all ray-finned fishes, by far the most belong to the infraclass teleostei (Greek, "complete bone").
20	430 mya	Ray-Finned Fish (Actinopterygii)	The Leafy Sea Dragon's Tale is about the plasticity of animal forms. Evolution has molded many teleosts into strange shapes. The leafy sea dragon hangs motionless among kelp, which it resembles. Shrimpfish have been elongated to resemble strands of seaweed. The snipe eel has been stretched, while the gulper eel sports grotesquely large jaws. The ocean sunfish, weighing up to two tons, resembles a vast disc or millstone, as its Latin name, Mola mola, suggests. Teleosts can control buoyancy because of a unique adaptation, described in the next tale.
20	430 mya	Ray-Finned Fish (Actinopterygii)	The Pike's Tale is about exaptation. Contrary to common belief, the swim bladder is not the progenitor of the lung. The bony-fish ancestor possessed a primitive lung which, in teleosts, was co-opted as the swim bladder, used to maintain hydrostatic equilibrium. In some teleosts, it is used as resonating device.
20	430 mya	Ray-Finned Fish (Actinopterygii)	The Cichlid's Tale is about adaptive radiation. Cichlids in the African Great Lakes have fast formed new species. Lake Victoria cichlids are distinct from Lake Malawi cichlids which are distinct from Lake Tanganyika cichlids. The authors quote George W. Barlow on the cause of speciation: “Genes flow but not much.” In allopatric speciation, a physical barrier disrupts gene flow, one reason islands have been so important in evolution. But any isolated environment could be considered an island. To a fish, a lake is an island, if not an archipelago (since not all parts are equally habitable.) The authors recount how, by constructing an "unrooted haplotype network" with computational phylogenetics of mitochondrial DNA, Erik Verheyen, Walter Salzburger, Jos Snoeks and Axel Meyer were able to infer the time and the location of each major speciation event. Geologic evidence shows that Lake Tanganyika was once split into three lakes. Genetic evidence shows splitting into three species around the same time. All the species are ultimately derived from a single species flock from Lake Kivu. As in "The Galápagos Finch’s Tale", different lines of evidence corroborate one another.
20	430 mya	Ray-Finned Fish (Actinopterygii)	The Blind Cave Fish's Tale is about Dollo's Law that evolution cannot be reversed. A seeming exception comes from species colonizing caves, which convergently evolve similar adaptations, such as the loss of skin pigmentation and eyes. Different populations of Mexican tetra (Astyanax mexicanus) have separately ventured into caves, and each has evolved white skin and blindness. This can be explained by opportunity cost: resources spent on building eyes cannot be used for other things. In a cave, resources spent on eyes can be used for things more useful in that environment, and the eyes become vestigial. Another possibility is that, in the absence of selective pressure, deleterious mutations accumulate. Eyes won’t be selected for if they’re not useful in the present, even if they may be in the future. Natural selection is blind.
20	430 mya	Ray-Finned Fish (Actinopterygii)	The Flounder's Tale is about evolutionary tinkering. Most fish are symmetric, with an eye on either side. But evolution has fashioned flatfish for a life lying flat on the ocean floor. During development, the eye on the lower (blind) side migrates to the upper side. This happens whether they lie on their left (plaice) or right (turbot). This asymmetry results in distortions in the skull. Dawkins discussed this in his Royal Institution Christmas Lectures, on “Designed and Designoid Objects”.
21	460 mya	Sharks (Chondrichthyes)	Sharks, rays and the related animals are supported by a cartilaginous skeleton that never ossifies to become bone. Their skin is covered in dermal denticles, tiny scale-like protrusions, from which teeth may have evolved. Sharks lack a swim bladder for buoyancy and instead rely on constantly swimming, retaining urea in their blood, and large livers with plenty of oil to remain afloat. Concestor 21 was an ancestor to all gnathostomes, animals with lower jaws, a structure which evolved from the gill arches.
22	525 mya	Lampreys and Hagfish (Cyclostomata)	Jawless and limbless fishes, the lampreys and hagfish, join the pilgrimage to meet the concestor of all vertebrates. Unlike the rest of vertebrates, they retain the notochord, a stiffening cartilage rod running along the back of an animal, well into adulthood. In all other vertebrates, the vestigial notochord appears in the embryo briefly and is replaced by segmented, articulate backbones in adults. On the other hand, both the jawless fish and the jawed fish share characteristics common to all members of the phylum Chordata at some time in their life cycle, including the notochord, pharyngeal slit, and the post-anal tail.
22	525 mya	Lampreys and Hagfish (Cyclostomata)	The Lamprey's Tale is a variation on the theme of “The Howler Monkey’s Tale”, about how gene duplication creates genetic novelty. In vertebrates, haemoglobin, the protein that carries oxygen in the blood, is composed of four globin chains, two alpha and two beta. The genes coding for haemoglobin are paralogous, derived from duplication. An ancestor globin gene from an ancient vertebrate split into two genes, which ended up on two different chromosomes. (In humans, they are coded for by gene clusters on chromosomes 11 and 16, respectively.) Both alpha and beta further split into more independently evolving genes. We can make a prediction: Lampreys and hagfish are ancient and predate this gene split, so split globin genes should not be found in them. But they should be found in bony fish, amphibians, reptiles, birds and mammals. That is what is found.
23	535 mya	Sea Squirts (Urochordata)	The lancelet and sea squirt have been switched in the second edition based on DNA studies. A sea squirt resembles a sedentary bag of seawater anchored to a rock. It feeds on food particles strained from water. Anatomically, the sea squirt looks very different from the joining pilgrimage of all vertebrates and protochordates, that is, until its larvae are examined. The sea squirt larva looks and swims like a tadpole. It possesses a notochord and a dorsal nerve tube and moves by undulating its post-anal tail from side to side. Vertebrates may have branched off from ancient sea squirt larvae via neoteny, in a process reminiscent of "The Axolotl's Tale". But recent DNA analysis on larvaceans favours Darwin's initial interpretation, that one branch of ancient tadpole-like protochordates evolved a new metamorphosis stage to turn into sedentary sea squirts. Sea squirts have some of the fastest recorded rates of molecular evolution.
24	540 to 775 mya	Lancelets (Amphioxiformes)	Lancelets are a textbook example of a chordate. Equipped with a notochord, a nerve tube on the dorsal side and gill slits, they typify the phylum Chordata. But lancelets are not primitive nor our remote ancestor. They are as modern as all other members in the pilgrimage.
24	540 to 775 mya	Lancelets (Amphioxiformes)	The Lancelet's Tale is a variation on the theme of "The Duckbill's Tale", that all living animals have had equal time to evolve since the first concestor, and that no living animal should be described as either lower or more primitive. The authors extend this concept to apply to fossils as well. Even though it is tempting to label fossils as remote ancestors, they are more accurately described as our distant cousins who have been frozen in time.

=== Non-chordate animals ===
From the lancelets onward, the authors provide dates under duress stating that "dating becomes so difficult and controversial that my courage fails me".

Rendezvous point	Time	New Pilgrim	Tale
25	550 mya	Ambulacrarians	This diverse group includes the echinoderms, along with some organisms labelled "worms" and even Xenoturbella, which until 2016 could not be classified at all, but analysis of its genes finally established its position as a distant relative of the echinoderms.
26	560 mya	Protostomes	The protostomes (Greek, "mouth first") join the deuterostomes ("mouth second") . The division is based on the way animal embryos diverge after gastrulation, where the blastula (a hollow ball of cells) indents to form a cup. In the sub-kingdom of protostomia, the indentation eventually becomes the mouth. In deuterostomia which includes humans, the indentation eventually becomes the anus; the mouth is formed later. This ancestor is sometimes referred to as Urbilaterian. This brings in the Insecta which represent three-quarters of all animal species on Earth.
26	560 mya	Protostomes	The Ragworm's Tale is about the evolution of left-right symmetry in bilaterians. Dawkins discusses the evolution of eyes. Despite the diversity of eyes, the same genes control their development in different species, for reasons seen in "The Fruit Fly's Tale".
26	560 mya	Protostomes	The Brine Shrimp's Tale is about its proclivity for swimming upside down, which it shares with fairy shrimp. Dawkins suggests that natural selection favors individuals who learn a behavior, and that genes “catch up.” He asks how it is that animals come to distinguish up from down. It seems to be an instinct, as Dawkins’s graduate work showed.
26	560 mya	Protostomes	The Leaf Cutter's Tale is a variation on the theme of "The Farmer’s Tale". Fungus-growing ants of the genus Atta independently invented agriculture, long before humans, by domesticating fungi and harvesting their gongylidia. Several species of ants have independently domesticated aphids. The moral of the Tale is delayed gratification as the basis for agriculture.
26	560 mya	Protostomes	The Grasshopper's Tale is about the futility of racism.
26	560 mya	Protostomes	The Fruit Fly's Tale is about evolutionary developmental biology. It is a variation on the theme of "The Mouse’s Tale", about how genes control development. A handful of Hox genes control development in almost all animals. The body plans of mice, men and fruit flies are found in Hox genes, laid down in the same order on chromosomes in all species since Concestor 26.
26	560 mya	Protostomes	The Rotifer's Tale is about the evolution of sex. The bizarre bdelloid rotifer reproduces via parthenogenesis. Through mitosis, they produce eggs which yield genetically identical daughters. Mark Welch and Matthew Meselson have found that rotifers have been asexual for millions of years. John Maynard Smith called this “an evolutionary scandal.” The authors write that sex may be the real scandal. Why do we do it? One answer comes from the Red Queen hypothesis, that organisms are engaged in an evolutionary arms race against parasites. Sex (specifically, recombination during meiosis) creates the variation that is the raw material for natural selection.
26	560 mya	Protostomes	The Barnacle's Tale is about how appearances can be deceiving, as Darwin discovered through long study. Barnacles, as their larva stage reveals, are crustaceans. Perhaps the most bizarre barnacle is Sacculina, which is as a parasitic castrator of crabs.
26	560 mya	Protostomes	The Velvet Worm's Tale is about the Cambrian explosion. In the epilogue, the authors expound on the molecular clock method used throughout the book, Motoo Kimura's neutral theory of molecular evolution and Tomoko Ohta's nearly neutral theory of molecular evolution. As seen in "The Gibbon's Tale", the genetic code is degenerate, as many codons code for the same amino acid. A synonymous substitution will be invisible to natural selection but not to biologists.
27	570 mya	Acoelomorph Flatworms	Still under debate on how this group fits in due to a long period of molecular evolution similar to "The Gibbon's Tale". These flatworms lack an anus or a coelom. The organs do not sit in a coelom but a parenchyma and is the reason for the name of the group.
28	590 mya	Cnidarians	The Jellyfish's Tale discusses how some underwater organisms migrate between different depths due to day and night cycles.
28	590 mya	Cnidarians	The Polypifer’s Tale is about the formation of coral reefs. Corals are symbionts with zooxanthellae, photosynthetic algae, and as such grow in "shallow sunlit waters." How do barrier reefs form in deep ocean? Darwin discussed this in his first scientific book, The Structure and Distribution of Coral Reefs. He suggested that the seafloor subsided. His theory still stands, with the subsidence explained by plate tectonics.
29	600 mya	Ctenophores (Comb jellies)	It is not completely clear whether Ctenophora should be placed here as an outgroup to all animals and actually at rendezvous 31. But this would mean that they either independently invented muscle, nerves, cell layers or that the sponges lost them: only 100 species but quite numerous. DNA studies are also complicated by incomplete lineage sorting.
30	620 mya	Placozoans	Only one species identified. It looks like a multicellular amoeba.
31	650 mya	Sponges	The last animal of the chain. Do not move but have a coordinated movement between cells. Also, seems to be two lines of sponges based on molecular data. Sponge cells are totipotent.
31	650 mya	Sponges	The Sponge's Tale is about multicellularity. In 1907, Henry Van Peters Wilson separated a sponge into its component cells with a sieve. The sponges reassembled themselves. The authors suggest this sheds light on the origin of metazoans.

=== Non-animal eukaryotes ===
There are essential differences between the 1st and 2nd editions of the book in this section. Another rendezvous has been added (#33), and the unknown rendezvous has been partially resolved.

Rendezvous point	Time	New Pilgrim	Tale
32	800 mya	Choanoflagellates (Choanoflagellatea)	The Choanoflagellate's Tale is about the evolution of multicellularity. Choanoflagellates are the closest living relatives of the multicellular animals, and can form temporary colonies from a free-living unicellular stage. Sponges have choanocytes, cells that resemble single-celled choanoflagellates, providing an indication about how multicellularity may have evolved. This common ancestor is sometimes called urmetazoan and several theories have been developed on its evolution.
33	900 mya	Filastereans (Filasterea)	New addition to 2nd edition based on 2008 work. Pushes all others back one.
34	1000 mya	DRIPs (Mesomycetozoea)	The acronym comes from the letters of the four genera that were first known. These are single-cell parasites of fish and other freshwater animals. DNA sequencing has added about 50 species. Of course, this concestor could not have been a parasite of a fish.
35	1200 mya	Fungi	Only 99,000 of the 4 million estimated species have been identified.
36	(?)	Uncertain	A protozoan grouping called Apusozoa made up of 3 protist groups breviata, ancyromonads and apusomonads.
37	(?)	Amoebozoans (Amoebozoa)	'Amoeba' is a description rather than a classification because many unrelated eukaryotes exhibit an amoeboid form.
38	(?)	Very large group of light harvesters and their kin: excavates, SAR supergroup, 20 species of single-celled glaucophytes, over 4,000 species of red algae, and hundreds of thousands of species of green plants.	The Cauliflower's Tale is about Kleiber's law. Geometrical considerations of constructing the most efficient supply tube network in tissues dictate a scaling exponent of 3/4 for such structures as cauliflower and the human brain.
38	(?)	Very large group of light harvesters and their kin: excavates, SAR supergroup, 20 species of single-celled glaucophytes, over 4,000 species of red algae, and hundreds of thousands of species of green plants.	The Redwood's Tale is about dendrochronology. It explains different methods of radiometric dating such as Uranium–lead dating and Potassium-argon dating (for geologic samples) and Carbon dating (for biological samples).
38	(?)	Very large group of light harvesters and their kin: excavates, SAR supergroup, 20 species of single-celled glaucophytes, over 4,000 species of red algae, and hundreds of thousands of species of green plants.	The Humped Bladderwort's Tale is about the C-value paradox, that the size of an organism’s genome does not correspond to complexity. In 1983, Barbara McClintock won the Nobel Prize in Physiology or Medicine for her discovery of transposons, genetic elements that cut and paste themselves through the genome. The C-value paradox is resolved by differences in the number of transposons. The Humped Bladderwort has excised most of its parasitic DNA. This may be because a paucity of phosphorus, a key element of DNA, created selective pressure to economize production of the molecule. In primates (including humans), the most common parasitic element is Alu. Presumably, it emerged between Concestors 9 and 10.
38	(?)	Very large group of light harvesters and their kin: excavates, SAR supergroup, 20 species of single-celled glaucophytes, over 4,000 species of red algae, and hundreds of thousands of species of green plants.	The Mixotrich's Tale is about symbiosis. Mixotricha paradoxa translates to ‘unexpected combination of hairs’, so named by J. L. Sutherland because she thought it had both cilia and flagella, not thought possible in protists. In fact, they are not cilia, but bacteria, specifically spirochaetes, which serve Mixotricha as ‘galley slaves’ in S. L. Tramm’s phrase. Mixotricha is itself a symbiont, helping its host digest cellulose. It lives only in the termite Mastotermes darwiniensis.

=== Great Historic Rendezvous ===
The authors describe the origin of eukaryotes (Greek, "true kernel"), organisms with a cell nucleus and Lynn Margulis's endosymbiotic theory. Mitochondrion and chloroplasts have their own DNA and divide by binary fission, like bacteria. Margulis surmised that this is because they are descended from free-living bacteria.

=== Prokaryotes ===
Prokaryotes (Greek, "before kernel") lack a cell nucleus. They can move genetic material between unicellular and multicellular organisms via horizontal gene transfer.

Rendezvous point	Time	New Pilgrim	Tale
39	(?)	Archaea	Carl Woese proposed Archaea as a distinct Kingdom, apart from Eukarya and Bacteria. Archaea have metabolic pathways more closely related to eukaryotes such as the enzymes involved in transcription and translation.
40	(?)	Eubacteria	The Rhizobium's Tale is about the evolution of the bacterial flagellum, likely from a Type II secretion system, citing work by Kenneth R. Miller. The authors note that, despite the diversity of animal body plans, wheels seem only to have evolved once, in these humble organisms.
40	(?)	Eubacteria	Taq's Tale is about the thermophilic bacteria Thermus aquaticus, which lives in the near-boiling waters of the Grand Prismatic Spring in Yellowstone National Park. It is beloved by biologists as the source of the enzyme Taq polymerase, used in polymerase chain reaction.

=== “Canterbury” ===
The authors speculate about the origin of life, from Darwin's "warm little pond" through J. B. S. Haldane and Alexander Oparin’s “primordial soup”, the Miller–Urey experiment and Spiegelman's Monster. In 1952, Stanley Miller and Harold Urey mixed methane, ammonia, hydrogen and water and sparked it with electricity. The product included seven amino acids, among them glycine, aspartic acid and alanine, among the twenty used to make proteins. In 1965, Sol Spiegelman seeded test tubes with enterobacteria phage Qbeta, and found it was subject to variation and selection. RNA can catalyze chemical reactions (like an enzyme) and store information (like DNA), indicating that it may have been the first replicator. The discovery of life near hydrothermal vents indicates that life may have begun deep underwater, or underground.

=== “The Host’s Return” ===
Dawkins, in the spirit of Stuart Kauffman, speculates on what would happen if evolution were “rerun”. Eyes have evolved as many as forty times convergently, as Dawkins describes in "The Forty-Fold Path to Enlightenment" in Climbing Mount Improbable. Several species have evolved gliding: colugos, flying squirrels and sugar gliders. From so simple a beginning, flight has evolved at least four times (in insects, pterosaurs, birds and bats). Echolocation has also evolved at least four times (in oilbirds, cave swiftlets, cetaceans and, again, bats) as Dawkins describes in "Making Tracks Through Animal Space" in The Blind Watchmaker. However, as seen in “The Rhizobium’s Tale”, wheels seem to have evolved only once, in bacteria. Similarly, syntactic language seems to have evolved only once, in humans.

He concludes that science gives meaning to human existence: “Not only did evolution happen, it eventually led to beings capable of comprehending the process, and even of comprehending how they came to comprehend it.”

== Reception ==
Carl Zimmer of the New York Times called it is one of the best books to understand evolutionary trees.

Rob Colwell of the Wall Street Journal called it "a fittingly superior beast -- lavishly produced and, weighing in at 1.6 kilograms, substantially heavier than the fully-evolved human brain that thought it up."

Clive Cookson of the Financial Times called it "one of the richest accounts of evolution ever written. It is also an object lesson in the way thorough picture research, carefully commissioned illustrations and good design can enhance even the best text." He adds "He is so good at explaining complex scientific issues that readers will learn painlessly about matters well outside the author's field of evolutionary biology, from maths to cosmology. But he interlaces the hard science with 'pleasing speculations', humorous asides, personal anecdotes and even political observations." He concludes "we have no right to expect a second magnum opus on the scale of The Ancestor's Tale."

Robin McKie in The Guardian thought it awkward to move backward in time starting from humans and thought this required linguistic gymnastics. Matt Ridley, in the same publication, appreciated the approach of a Chaucerian pilgrim traveling backwards and the perspective of not seeing other animals as failures. Marek Kohn wrote "The success of this book comes from having one truly Chaucerian character: the author himself."

Jody Hey notes that Dawkins "writes engagingly on evolutionary topics. With a highly self-assured style, he effortlessly draws insightful connections among disparate notions, trapping the curiosity of readers before they know what's coming." However, he says "An unfortunate editorial oversight is seen in the text's occasional straying into political commentary. Worse still, Dawkins at one point chastises Richard Lewontin, the great population geneticist, for sometimes interjecting politics into scientific discourse. This little touch of hypocrisy is hard to miss if you read the entire volume. But such lapses amount to a few dozen words in a weighty, truly wonderful book."

Steve Jones calls it "a rigorous and impressively complete account of the Tree of Life… The Ancestor's Tale achieves the almost impossible: it makes biology (not biochemistry, brain science, or bird-watching, but biology as a whole) interesting again. Everyone possessed of a cell nucleus should read it, and ponder their own unimportance. One mystery remains: what did the star-nosed mole say to the duck-billed platypus?"

== Translations ==
The Ancestor's Tale has been translated into languages including Dutch, French, German, Italian, Portuguese, Spanish, Russian, and Turkish.

== See also ==
- Evolutionary history of life
- Phylogenetic tree
- Timeline of evolution
  - Timeline of human evolution
- Almost Like a Whale, Steve Jones's update of On the Origin of Species
- Genome, Matt Ridley's exploration of the human genome in 23 chapters, each focusing on a specific gene on a different chromosome
- The Beak of the Finch, Jonathan Weiner's account of Peter and Rosemary Grant's study of Darwin's finches
