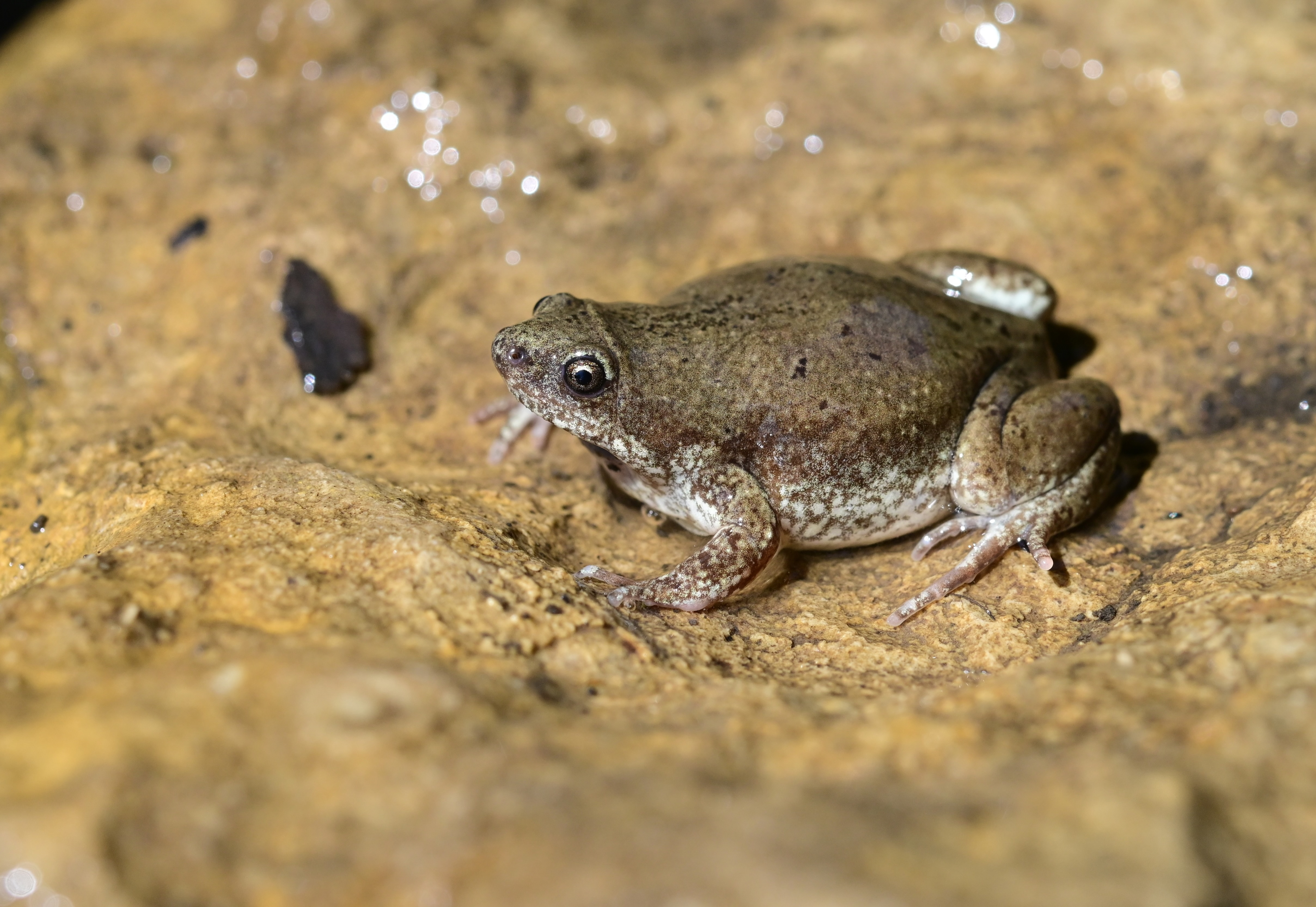
- Western Narrow-mouthed Toad

Conservation status
- Least Concern (IUCN 3.1)

Scientific classification
- Kingdom: Animalia
- Phylum: Chordata
- Class: Amphibia
- Order: Anura
- Family: Microhylidae
- Genus: Gastrophryne
- Species: G. olivacea

Binomial name
- Gastrophryne olivacea Hallowell, 1856

Synonyms
- Engystoma olivaceum

= Gastrophryne olivacea =

Species of amphibian

Gastrophryne olivacea, the Great Plains narrow-mouthed toad or western narrow-mouthed toad, is a species of microhylid frog found throughout much of the south-central United States from Nebraska south through Texas, and into northern Mexico. Though not a true toad, evidenced by the smooth, moist skin, its common name is due to its terrestrial habit.

== Description ==
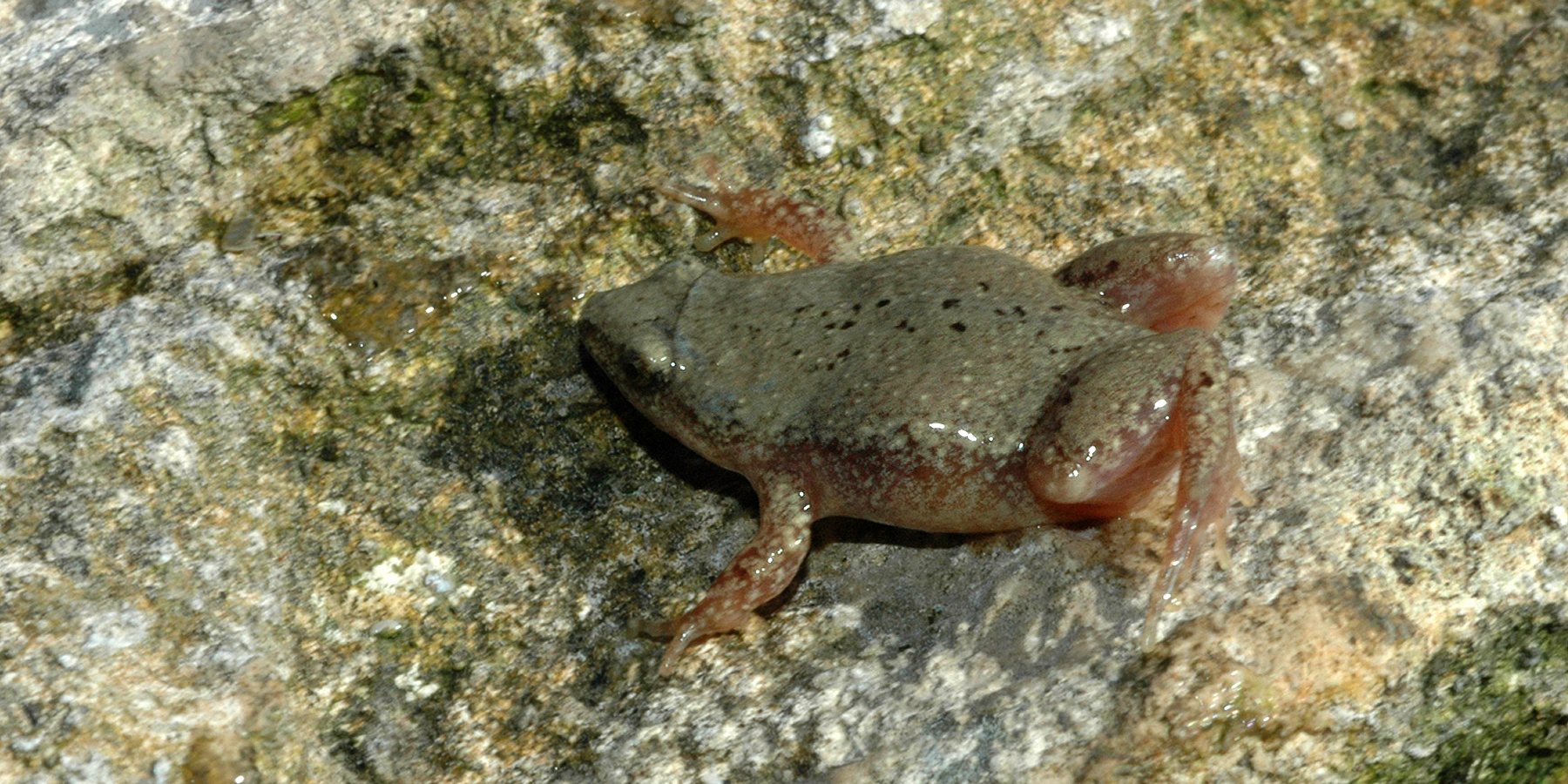
Western narrow-mouthed toad (Gastrophryne olivacea), Municipality of San Fernando, Tamaulipas, Mexico (19 March 2009)

Great Plains narrow-mouthed toads are a small (19-42 mm snout to vent), fossorial, flat-bodied species, with a sharply pointed snout. They are typically olive green to grey-brown in color, sometimes with black blotching. Their undersides are lighter colored. Their skin secretions can cause severe, burning pain if they get into the eyes.

== Behavior and habitat ==
This toad is found in a wide range of habitats, but most frequently on moist ground or in leaf litter, and under rocks or fallen logs. They breed throughout the spring and summer in pools of water left by rainfall. They have been found to hybridize with Gastrophyrne carolinensis. Their primary diet is ants.

Western narrow-mouthed toads have a mutualistic relationship with tarantulas. They will live together, and in exchange will eat ants that attempt to invade the tarantula's burrow. Chemicals in their skin make the toads unpalatable to the spiders. Similar mutualistic behavior has been observed in other microhylid frogs.

== Taxonomy ==
Gastrophryne olivacea was once considered a subspecies of the eastern narrowmouth toad, G. carolinensis. G. oliviacea was previously called G. mazatlanensis.

There are no valid subspecies of this taxon at this time. This taxon was originally divided into two subspecies, but in 2012 the western subspecies was elevated to full species status (Gastrophryne mazatlanensis = the Sinaloan narrow-mouthed toad).
