= Yan Wong =

Evolutionary geneticist

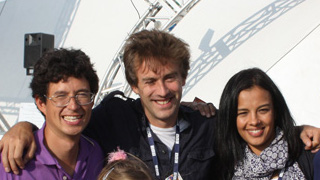
- Yan Wong (left) and his fellow co-hosts of Bang Goes the Theory, Dallas Campbell (middle) and Liz Bonnin (right), in 2010
- Education: University of Oxford
- Scientific career
- Fields: Evolutionary biology
- Workplaces: University of Oxford; University of Leeds
- Doctoral advisor: Alan Grafen
- Website: https://www.bdi.ox.ac.uk/Team/yan-wong

Yan Wong (Chinese: 黃可仁; Cantonese Yale: wòhng hó yàhn) is an evolutionary biologist, the television presenter of Bang Goes the Theory and co-author of The Ancestor's Tale with Richard Dawkins. He currently works at the Big Data Institute at the University of Oxford
