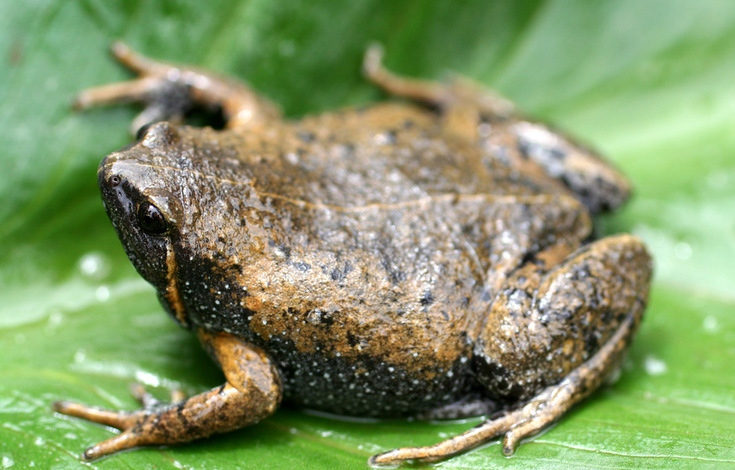

Conservation status
- Near Threatened (IUCN 3.1)

Scientific classification
- Kingdom: Animalia
- Phylum: Chordata
- Class: Amphibia
- Order: Anura
- Family: Microhylidae
- Genus: Hypopachus
- Species: H. barberi

Binomial name
- Hypopachus barberi Schmidt, 1939

= Hypopachus barberi =

Species of frog in the family Microhylidae from Central America

Hypopachus barberi (common names: Barber's sheep frog, montane sheep frog) is a species of frog in the family Microhylidae. It is found in El Salvador, Guatemala, Honduras, and Mexico. This species is found in humid pine-oak forests at the elevations of 1,470–2,200 m (4,820–7,220 ft) asl. It is threatened by habitat loss due to logging.
