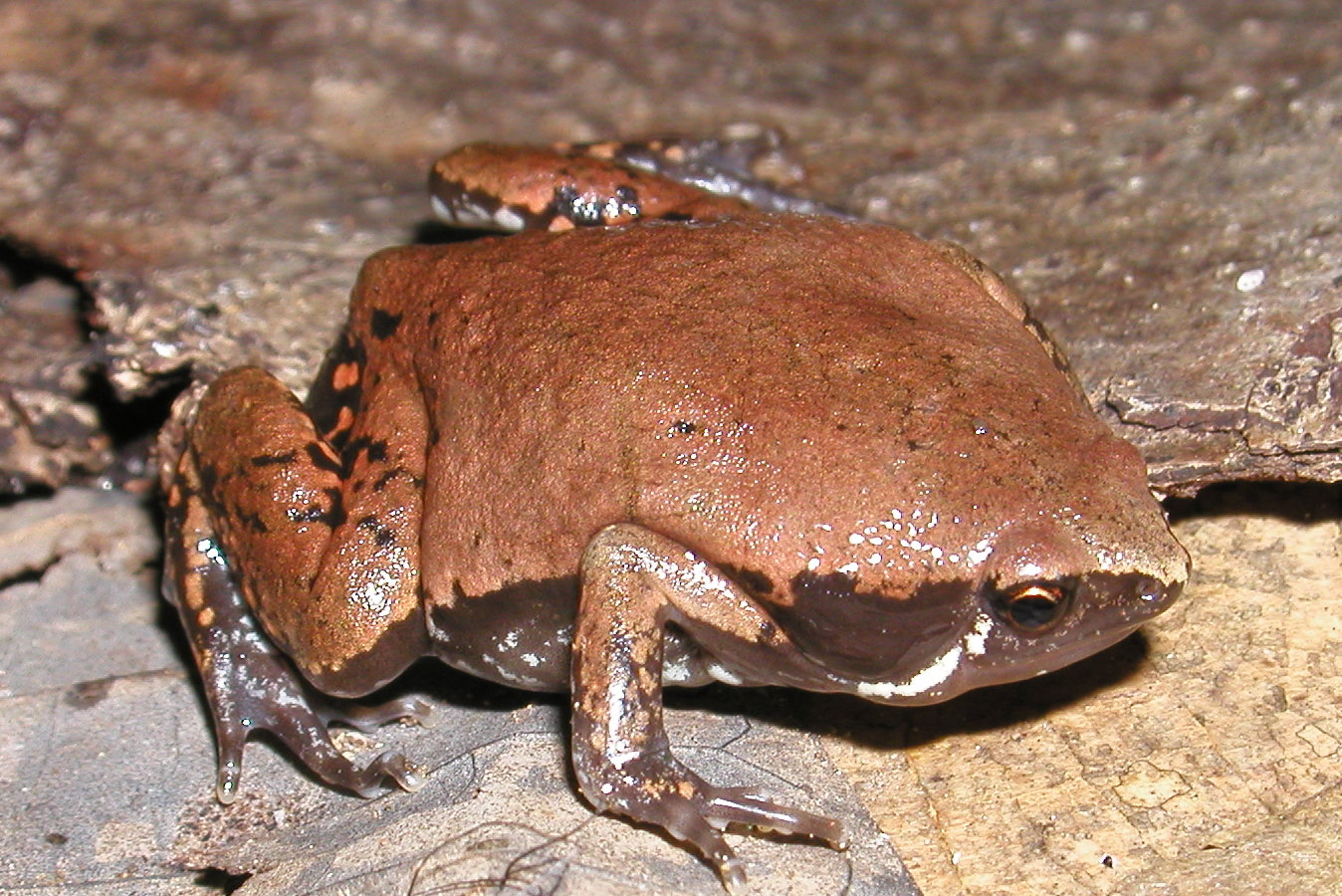

Conservation status
- Least Concern (IUCN 3.1)

Scientific classification
- Kingdom: Animalia
- Phylum: Chordata
- Class: Amphibia
- Order: Anura
- Family: Microhylidae
- Genus: Hypopachus
- Species: H. variolosus

Binomial name
- Hypopachus variolosus Cope, 1866

= Northern sheep frog =

Species of amphibian

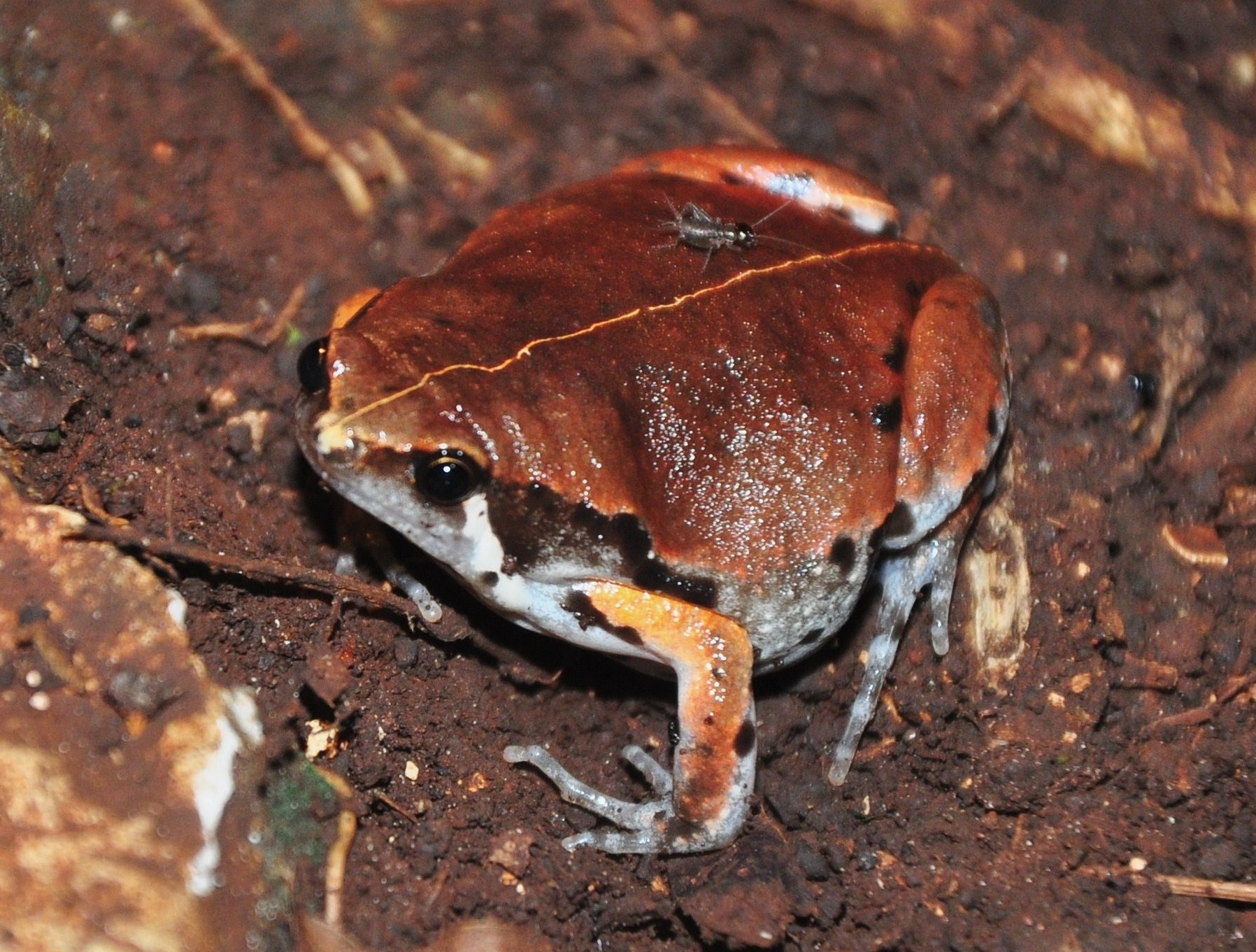
Sheep frog (Hypopachus variolosus), Quintana Roo, Mexico, (July 29, 2012)

The northern sheep frog (Hypopachus variolosus) is native to Central America, Mexico, and extreme south Texas, United States. It occurs in the lowlands from Sonora, Mexico, to northern Costa Rica on the Pacific coast, and south Texas to Honduras on the Gulf of Mexico and Caribbean coasts. The sheep frog inhabits semiarid thornscrub, savannas, pasturelands, and open woodlands, as well as more humid, moist forest in the canyons, basins, foothills, and lower elevations of mountains slopes. It is a fossorial, burrowing frog that is seldom seen on the surface except at night after heavy rains when they emerge to breed. The sheep frog gets its name from its distinctive call that resembles a sheep's bleat. It is a diet specialist primarily feeding on termites and ants.

The sheep frog is a small, stout frog with short legs, ranging about 2.5-3.8 cm, with females growing larger than the males. The dorsal color ranges from tan, to reddish-tan, to various shades of brown with irregular black flecks or spots, which may be extensive on some individuals, or absent on others. An orange, red, or yellowish mid-dorsal stripe, running from the snout to the vent is present on some specimens, but may by absent, vague, or fragmented on others. It is a common species in some areas of its range, but it is uncommon in the US and listed as a threatened species in the state of Texas.

== Etymology and nomenclature ==
Hypopachus is derived from two compounded Greek words: hypo = under, beneath, lesser; and pachos = thickness, implying fat or thick. The specific epithet variolosus is derived from the Latin word vario or variola = to variegate or variegated; and osus = full of or prone to, referencing the markings on the frogs belly.

The standardized common names of sheep frog (singular) for the species Hypopachus variolosus, and sheep frogs (plural) for the genus Hypopachus, have long been established and are in wide usage. However, on Wikipedia, a previously established article on the genus Hypopachus has monopolized the common name sheep frogs and does not recognize the singular and plural forms of the same name (e.g. sheep frog, sheep frogs) as two separate pages, so the name northern sheep frog, which has some limited usage, has been applied here.

Some other names used early in the 20th century, before the establishment of standardized common names include, Mexican narrow-mouthed toad, Taylor's toad, and Brownsville narrow-mouthed toad.

== Taxonomy ==
Hypopachus variolosus is a variable species with a long list of synonyms. Sheep frogs occur in a wide range of color and pattern variations, calls, and toe structure, suggesting that the species as currently understood (2021) might represent a species complex.

== Description ==
The sheep frog is a relatively small frog, 2.5-3.8 cm, with rare individuals exceeding 4 cm. Males average 3.3 mm and females average 3.8 mm.

== Distribution ==
The sheep frog ranges through parts of Central America and Mexico, generally in lower elevation coastal areas below 1600 m, reaching its northernmost limit in far south Texas, US. On the Pacific coast it occurs from northwest Costa Rica, into western Nicaragua, north through western Mexico including the Balsas basin, into Sinaloa, and adjacent areas of extreme southern Sonora and Chihuahua. In Honduras and Guatemala it ranges across continent to the Atlantic (Caribbean Sea) coast, north into Belize and throughout the Yucatán Peninsula, up the coast to Nuevo León and Tamaulipas, Mexico, and adjacent areas of south Texas, US. Several areas within the range, such as southern Belize and northern Sinaloa lack records, suggesting possible gaps in the distribution. Conversely, relatively informal records available on internet web sites suggest the range extents significantly further into interior regions of southern Mexico than previously known.

In the US, it occurs on the southern coast of Texas in at least 16 counties, from the lower Rio Grande Valley northward as far as Goliad County north of Corpus Christi. Some older maps indicate a distributional gap in northern Tamaulipas, Mexico, suggesting the Texas population is isolated from populations in southern Tamaulipas and Nuevo León. However, a few sparse records have appeared in recent years filling portions of that gap.

== Ecology and natural history ==
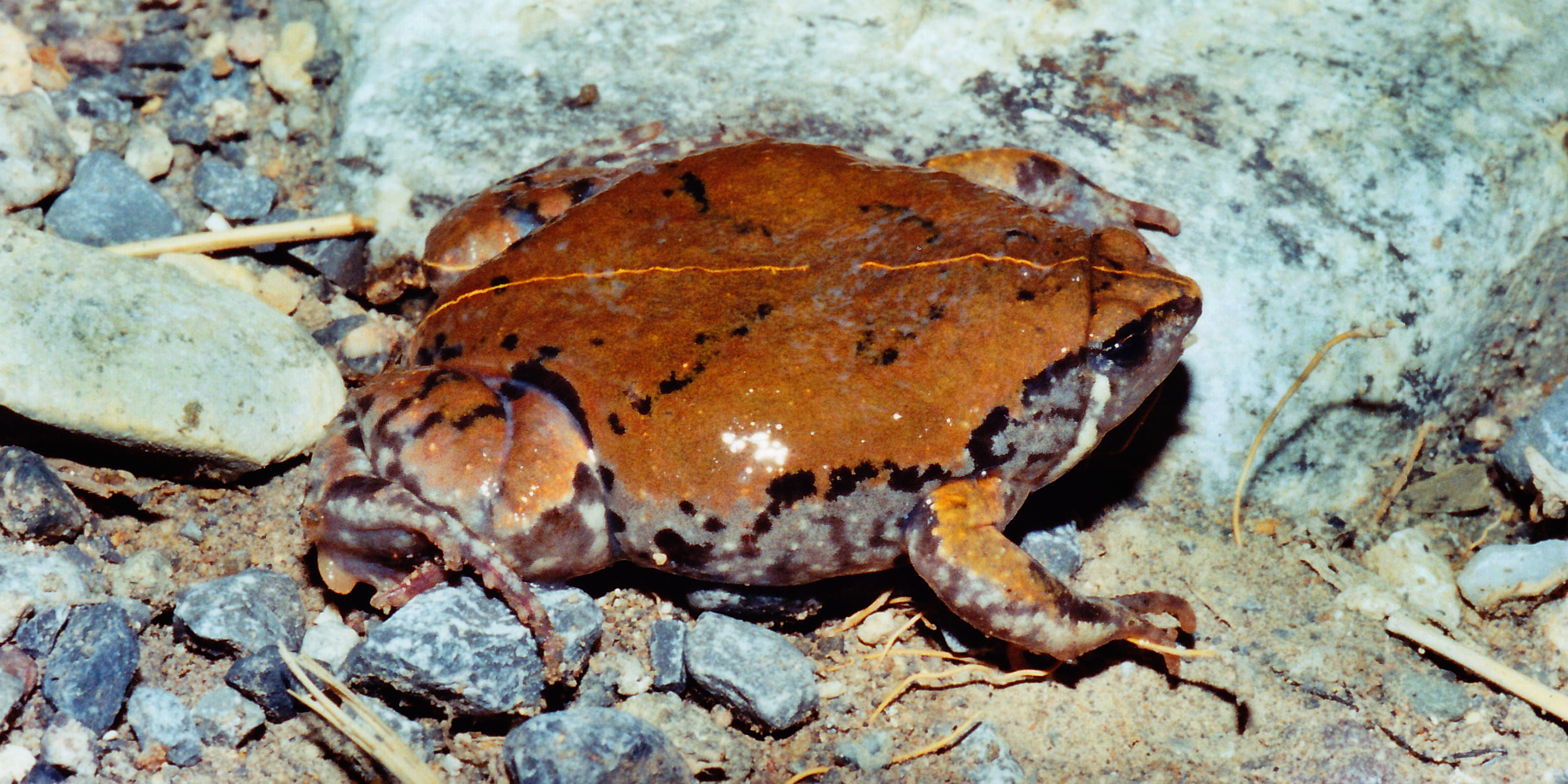
Sheep frog (Hypopachus variolosus), Municipality of Victoria, Tamaulipas, Mexico (August 12, 2003).

Diet: Sheep frogs are diet specialist, feeding largely on termites and ants (Hymenoptera), although some minute flies (Diptera) and other insects are occasionally consumed as well.

Habitat: Hypopachus variolosus is known to occur in a variety habitats, most frequently reported from semiarid thornscrub and savanna environments. It also occurs in drier open woodlands, as well as more humid canyons, basins, foothills and premontane forest up to 1000–1200 meters (ca. 1600 m. maximum). Disturbed areas such as pasturelands, irrigation ditches, and vacant lots are also occupied. One author wrote that it is absent from undisturbed moist lowland forest in southern Mexico and Central America. In Texas, it is restricted to the semiarid thornscrub and grasslands of the Tamaulipan mezquital ecoregion. Sheep frogs are secretive and largely fossorial, known to live in the cavities of hollowed out root systems of trees and shrubs, mammal burrows, and pack rat nest. It is capable of burrowing backwards with its hind feet into loose soils, just below the surface during wet periods, and up to a meter in dry seasons. It emerges after heavy rains to breed and occasionally forage at night, and may be found under rocks, logs and fallen palm trees, and other surface debris while soils remain wet.

Reproduction: Sheep frogs deposit their eggs between March and September or October. Emergence and mating is typically stimulated by heavy rain, or on occasions the irrigation of fields. Males often call while freely floating on the surface of shallow pools. The call is a sheep-like bleat about two to three seconds in duration. Amplexus is axillary and the eggs are deposited in the water, floating at the surface in loosely attached rafts. Typically (although not exclusively) eggs are deposited in ephemeral pools of rainwater, but also in ponds, marshes, ditches, and cattle tanks. Clutches of about 700 eggs have been reported and they hatch within 12 to 24 hours. The tadpoles are brownish with faint markings on the belly, and some individuals exhibit a mid-dorsal stripe, growing up to 2.7-3.5 cm in total length. Metamorphose occurs after about one month and froglets are 1-1.6 cm snout to vent length.

== Conservation ==
Although Hypopachus variolosus is a wide-ranging species and common in some areas of its distribution, it is uncommon within its limited range in the US, and it is protected by law in the state of Texas where it is listed as a threatened species. Threats in Texas include fragmentation and loss of habitat due to agriculture and urban expansion.
