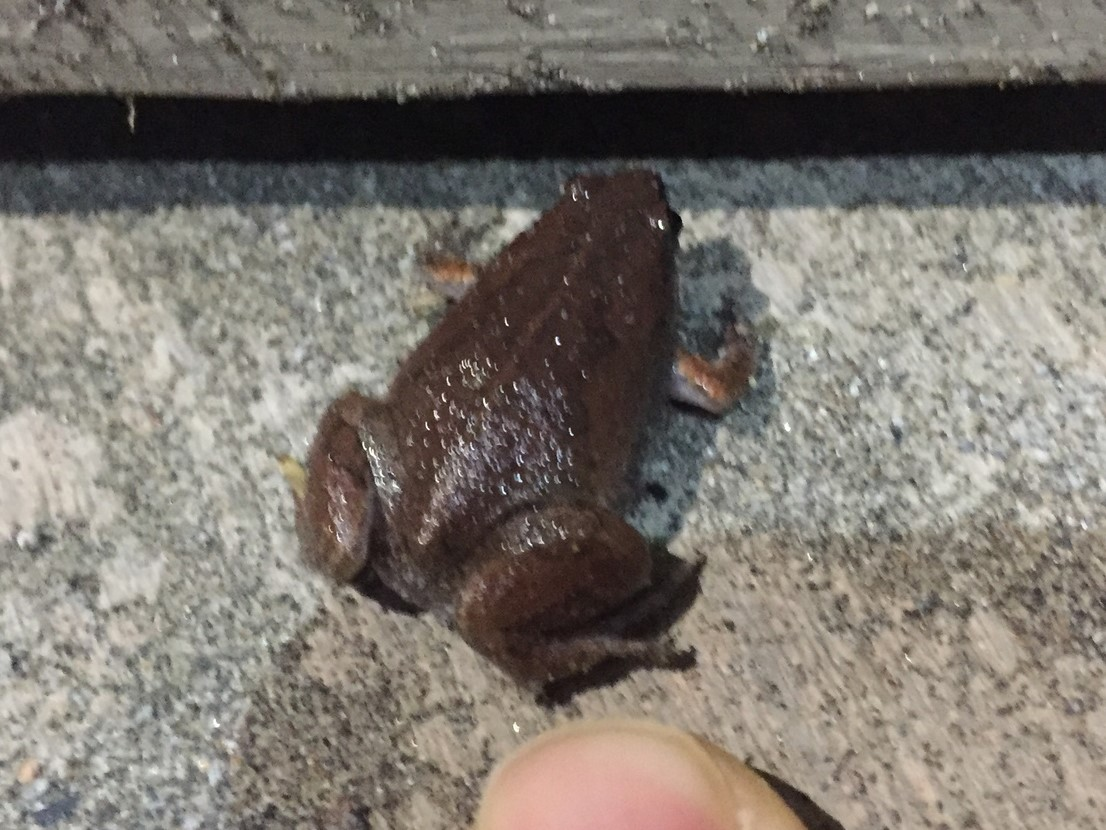

Conservation status
- Least Concern (IUCN 3.1)

Scientific classification
- Kingdom: Animalia
- Phylum: Chordata
- Class: Amphibia
- Order: Anura
- Family: Microhylidae
- Genus: Gastrophryne
- Species: G. elegans

Binomial name
- Gastrophryne elegans (Boulenger, 1882)

= Gastrophryne elegans =

Species of amphibian

Gastrophryne elegans, the elegant narrow-mouthed toad, is a species of frog in the family Microhylidae found in Central America. Its natural habitats are subtropical or tropical dry forests, subtropical or tropical moist lowland forests, intermittent freshwater marshes, plantations, rural gardens, and heavily degraded former forests. It is threatened by habitat loss.

== Description ==
The elegant narrow-mouthed toad has a small triangular head and is flattened dorsoventrally. The females have a snout-to-vent length of about 27 mm (1.06 in), while the males are slightly smaller. The colouring is somewhat variable and helps to camouflage this frog among the leaf litter. The dorsal surface has a broad, dark-brown, central stripe which widens and narrows irregularly and is delineated with a narrow, dark line. On either side is a reddish-brown area and then a dark-brown line that runs from the tip of the snout, past the eye, over the shoulder to the groin. The thighs have two dark bands and further lines occur on the lower leg which align when the animal is crouched. The ventral surface is dark brown or black, mostly obscured by indistinct whitish spots which merge. The hind feet each have a tubercle on the metatarsal and slight webbing on the fourth toe. The outer toes have flattened, spreading tips.

== Distribution and habitat ==
Gastrophyrne elegans is native to lowland Mexico, Guatemala, Belize, and Honduras on the Atlantic side of the continent. Its range extends from north-central coastal areas of Honduras to central Veracruz. An isolated population is found in the Sian Ka'an Biosphere Reserve on the Yucatán Peninsula. This species is found in tropical forests, where it lives on the ground among the leaf litter. It breeds in the rainy season in temporary pools.

== Status ==
The IUCN rates Gastrophryne elegans as "Least Concern", because of its large population, wide distribution, and tolerance of modifications to its habitat. Its population seems relatively stable and any decline is unlikely to be fast enough to justify listing it in a more threatened category. It is protected by legislation in Mexico under the "Special Protection" category.
