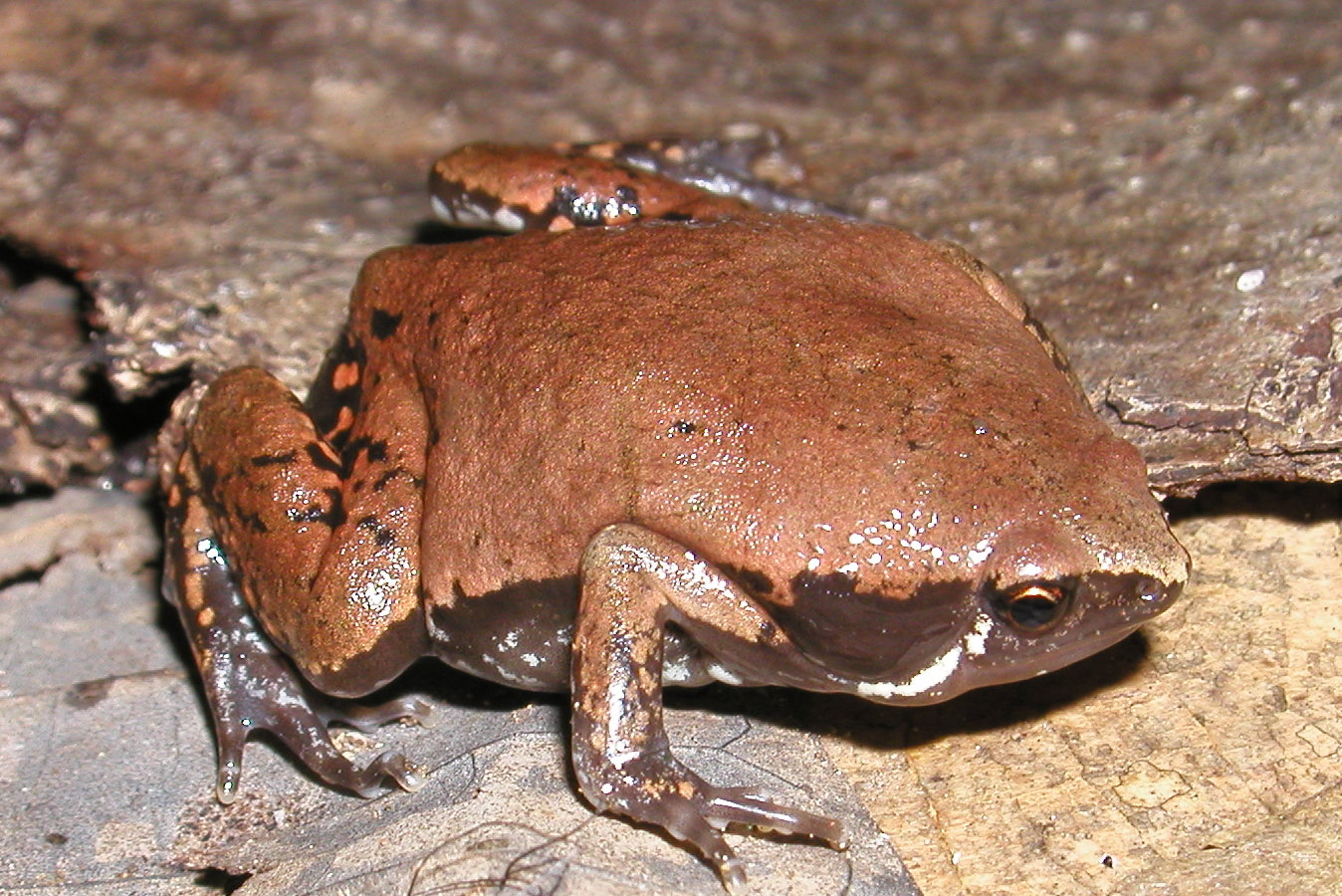
- Mexican narrow-mouthed toad (Hypopachus variolosus)

Scientific classification
- Domain: Eukaryota
- Kingdom: Animalia
- Phylum: Chordata
- Class: Amphibia
- Order: Anura
- Family: Microhylidae
- Subfamily: Gastrophryninae
- Genus: Hypopachus; Keferstein, 1867

Diversity
- 4 species

= Hypopachus =

Genus of amphibians

Hypopachus is a genus of microhylid frogs (common name: sheep frogs) found in the Americas between Costa Rica and the southern United States. They can bury themselves under the ground or moss. Its name means ‘somewhat thick’, referring to its tough skin.

== Species ==
The five species are:

- Hypopachus barberi Schmidt, 1939 – Barber's sheep frog
- Hypopachus guancasco Firneno, Itgen, Jacobs, Mcdaniels, Luque-Montes, Wilson, and Townsend, 2021 – Lenca sheep frog
- Hypopachus pictiventris (Cope, 1886)
- Hypopachus ustus (Cope, 1866)
- Hypopachus variolosus (Cope, 1866) – sheep frog
