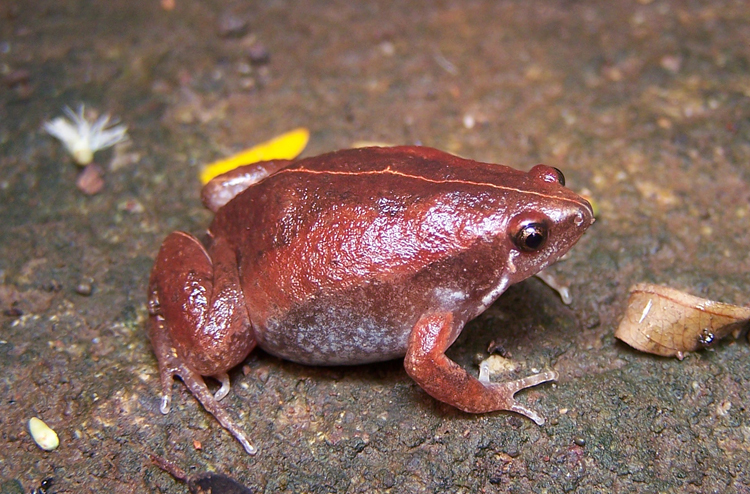

Conservation status
- Least Concern (IUCN 3.1)

Scientific classification
- Kingdom: Animalia
- Phylum: Chordata
- Class: Amphibia
- Order: Anura
- Family: Microhylidae
- Genus: Hypopachus
- Species: H. ustus

Binomial name
- Hypopachus ustus (Cope, 1866)

Synonyms
- Gastrophryne usta (Cope, 1866); Hypopachus ustum (Cope, 1866) [incorrect gender]

= Hypopachus ustus =

Species of frog

Hypopachus ustus, the two-spaded narrow-mouthed toad, is a species of frog in the family Microhylidae found in El Salvador, Guatemala, and Mexico. Its natural habitats are tropical dry and moist lowland forests. Breeding takes place in both temporary and permanent ponds. As this species is widespread and can live modified habitats, it is not considered threatened.
