= Hypopachus pictiventris =

Conservation status
- Least Concern (IUCN 3.1)

Scientific classification
- Kingdom: Animalia
- Phylum: Chordata
- Class: Amphibia
- Order: Anura
- Family: Microhylidae
- Genus: Hypopachus
- Species: H. pictiventris

Binomial name
- Hypopachus pictiventris (Cope, 1885)

Synonyms
- Gastrophryne pictiventris (Cope, 1885)

Species of frog

Gastrophryne pictiventris (common name: Nicaragua narrowmouth toad or southern narrowmouth toad) is a species of frog in the family Microhylidae. It is found in northeastern Costa Rica and southeastern Nicaragua. This species is found in leaf-litter of lowland moist and wet forests. However, it is not easily seen outside the explosive breeding events. Breeding takes place in temporary pools.

Forest destruction is considered a major threat to this species, although it is not considered to be threatened as a species.
