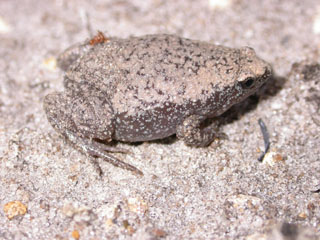

Conservation status
- Least Concern (IUCN 3.1)

Scientific classification
- Kingdom: Animalia
- Phylum: Chordata
- Class: Amphibia
- Order: Anura
- Family: Microhylidae
- Genus: Gastrophryne
- Species: G. carolinensis

Binomial name
- Gastrophryne carolinensis (Holbrook, 1835)

Synonyms
- Engystoma carolinense Holbrook, 1835; Engystoma rugosum Duméril and Bibron, 1841

= Gastrophryne carolinensis =

Species of amphibian

Gastrophryne carolinensis, the eastern narrow-mouthed toad, is a species of microhylid frog. It is a relatively small, toad-like amphibian found in damp, shady habitats. The species is highly fossorial, and feeds primarily on ants. These North American microhylids (Family: Microhylidae) are distinguished from true toads (genus Bufo), and other anurans by their moist, smooth skin, their lack of eardrums or tympana, their distinguishable squat body shape, and the unique fold of skin superior to their eyes. It is found in the United States, from southern Maryland to the Florida Keys, west to Missouri, Arkansas and Texas. While not a true toad, it is so called because it is terrestrial.

== Taxonomy ==
Gastrophryne carolinensis belongs to one of the largest anuran families, the microhylids. No subspecies are currently recognized. The eastern narrowmouth toad is one of only three microhylids that currently live in the United States.

== Description ==
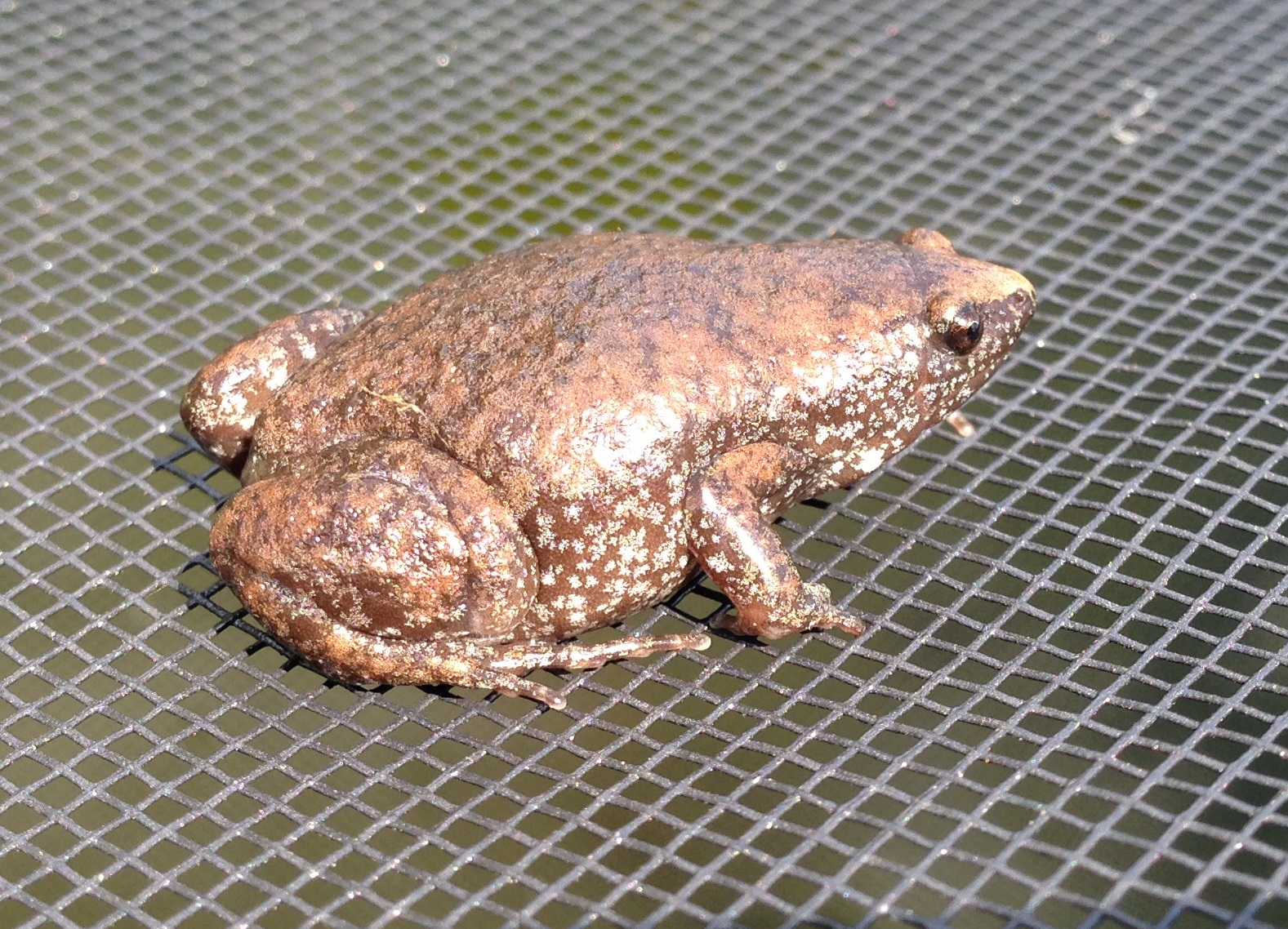
An adult male

The eastern narrow-mouthed toad is relatively small, growing to a maximum length of 53 mm (2.1 in). It has an oval-shaped body and a narrow head with a pointed snout. On the back of their head, they have a fold of skin that is capable of covering their eyes. They vary in color from brown and grey to green, often with black and white spotting. Usually there will be a dark brown stripe seen on both sides of the body. Gastrophryne carolinensis toads have a typical teardrop-shaped body that is characteristic of members of the family Microhylidae. Though its morphology lacks a tympanum (eardrum), the subgular vocal sac is clearly visible. The toes are long and unwebbed.

The skin of G. carolinensis is smooth and without ridges or warts. Yet, the skin is extremely tough, which most likely protects them from the ants upon which they feed. Directly behind the eyes, resting on the toad's neck, is a distinctive skin fold evolved for protection from ant bites while feeding.

The color of the toad can change depending on its activities and environment. The colors on its sides are generally faded, but its dorsum is dark and broad with various light or dark spots, mottling, or patches that cover the light strip along its middorsal area. Its abdomen is generally highly mottled, but its ventral surface is nearly light or unmarked. The venters of certain narrow-mouthed toads in the Great Plains are generally unmarked, or virtually so, while those of eastern toads are strongly pigmented.

Its legs are generally stubby, short, and heavy, and the tips of the toes are round and tapered. As with the Leptodactylidae, the toes are absent of webbing or toe pads. However, the heels on the back feet have one "spade" or tubercle for digging.

The sex of the eastern narrow-mouthed toad can easily be determined by the characteristic sexual dimorphism. The color of the throat region for males is dark and highly pigmented, while the female's throat is lighter.

G. carolinensis has a call that is said to sound like a bleating sheep or an electric buzzer; it is somewhat similar to the call of Anaxyrus fowleri.

== Range ==
The narrow-mouthed toad can reach elevations up to 550 m (1,800 ft). They are generally absent from most Blue Ridge Mountains and the Appalachian Mountains.

Gastrophyryne carolinensis is only one of three species belonging to the family Microhylidae native to the United States. The species resides in the southeastern quarter of the US, extending from Missouri and eastern Texas and Arkansas and from southern Maryland to the Florida Keys, as well as in an isolated colony in Iowa. Many have also been introduced to the little and great Bahamas, as well as the Cayman Islands.

Although they live in a broad range of habitats and are rather ubiquitous, their most important environmental variables must include moisture and shelter. They reside in either freshwater or terrestrial systems, and are able to use both temporary and permanent waters, as well as man-modified habitats. The members of this species tend to discount dry areas and mountains, though some may live in near desert-like conditions. Adults of this species are tolerant of brackish water so they have been able to inhabit barrier islands and coastal marshes.

General habitat types include:

- Borders of swamps
- Cypress-gum swamps
- Bottomland hardwoods
- Live-oak ridges
- Pine-oak uplands
- Sandy woodlands and hillsides
- Open woods
- Pine forests
- Coastal secondary dune scrub forest
- Maritime forests
- Small streams
- Beneath logs
- Near ponds with fallen logs and other debris
- Urban habitats such as:
  - Woodland lots
  - Sandy pinelands
- Suburban habitats such as:
  - Sandy soils around the lawn

== Population ==
The species' population is currently large throughout most of its range, and also in many suburban locations. Additionally, the species introduced to Grand Cayman is equally abundant. Though this particular species of microhylids experienced a severe population bottleneck effect in the past, its succeeding expansion has allowed its current population trend to remain stable.

Adults range from 22 to 35 mm (0.9–1.4 inches) in body length; females usually attain larger sizes than males and exceed a little over 1.25 inches. Adult males are at an inch or less in length. A male can be distinguished from a female during breeding season due to the visibility of a dark-pigmented vocal sac on his throat. Breeding males also exhibit enlarged tubercles on the chin, as well as a visible anterior edge of the lower jaw.

=== Breeding ===
Video of a male calling

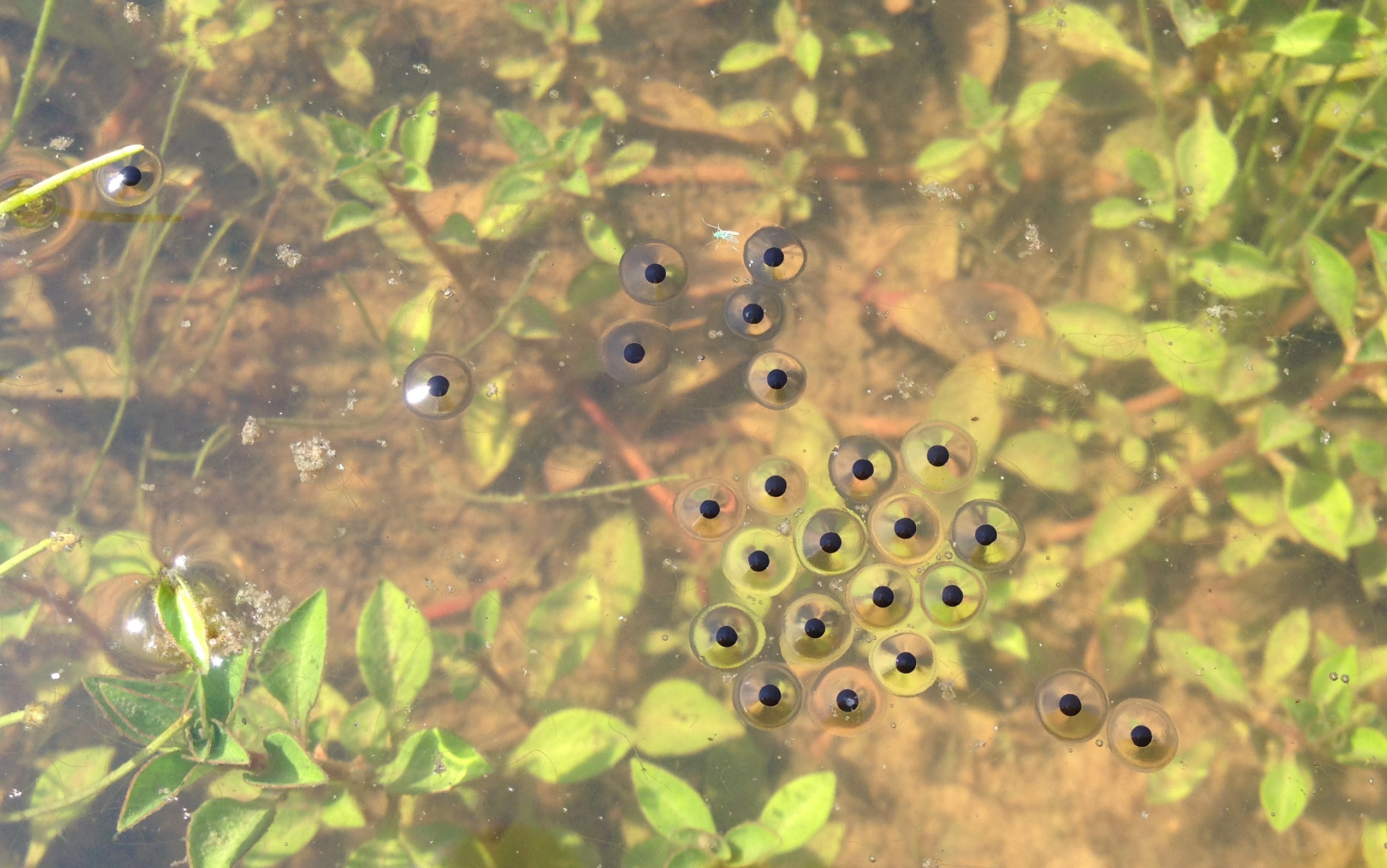
G. carolinensis eggs

Gastrophryne carolinensis reproduces in aquatic habitats, and may breed in either temporary or permanent waters. The toad species will breed in deep water only if it is covered with a dense mat of floating vegetation or debris. They may also breed in ephemeral aquatic habitats such as temporary ponds, roadside ditches, borrow pits, deep wheel ruts in roads, and shallow drainage ditches. These variable breeding locations indicate that this species exhibits opportunistic breeding behaviors when choosing a breeding site.

The male toads call for mating at reproductive maturity. They generally call from the edge of the water when concealed by plant debris. Though more rare, they have also been observed to call while floating in the water with their fore limbs resting on stem or twig. Many times, they will also extend their hind limbs. They can also call the female while sitting on a bank, or on rainy nights while buried in the damp sand with only their head and vocal sac exposed. If they are reproducing in ephemeral aquatic habitats, the male toad calling will position himself to be completely underwater with only his head exposed. The males will also utilize any type of vegetation in its surroundings in order to hide while calling. If alarmed, the male will dive deep into the water then re-emerge after several minutes.

The mating call sounds like a high-pitched, penetrating, nasal, sheep-like bleat. It may also have a buzzing quality, and lasts for 1.0 to 1.5 seconds. Unlike other frog and toad species, G. carolinensis does not exhibit the typical trill sound in their mating call.

In the south, April to October rains initiate their breeding season, or midsummer in areas farther to the north. They congregate to breeding ponds depending on the heavy spring and early summer rains. The G. carolinensis species is particularly successful at breeding in ephemeral bodies of water. When the male amplexes the female, special glands in the sternal region of males secretes a sticky substance to allow adhesion of breeding pairs, and also presumably to help him resist other males' attempts to dislodge him. Breeding grasp (amplexus) for the toad species is axillary (behind the forelimbs).

The female spawns clear marble-like eggs on the surface of the water, which is deposited as a mosaic structure. The egg mass is round or squarish, with 10 to 150 eggs deposited as clusters in each mass. The female deposits over 800 tiny eggs that hatch within 1.5 to 3.0 days.

=== Metamorphosis ===
Tadpoles transform in about 23–67 days, and unlike other anurans, they filter-feed on plankton.

The tadpoles' heads are pointed with lateral eyes, and they appear dorsolaterally flattened when viewed from above. Their bodies are dark in color (almost jet black), and are flecked with blue. Their bellies are marked with lateral whitish blotches, and the intestinal coil is not transparent through the skin. A lateral white stripe extends from the body to the tail, and a single spiracle is visible from the anus. They lack beak-like mandibles and the specialized labial tooth generally associated with most tadpoles. The newly transformed toads range from 7–12 mm (0.3-0.5 in) in body length. They are found to share the same habitat as adults, and the older stages of the tadpoles are also toxic to many predators. The males reach sexual maturity in a year, while the females reach sexual maturity in at 1–2 years of age.

=== Feeding behavior ===
Eastern narrow-mouthed toads are ant specialists, so 95% of their prey items are of various ant species. A study in 2013 identified 4,859 individual ants retrieved from stomachs of 146 eastern narrow-mouthed toads in Florida scrub and 160 of the additional 266 prey items were mites. These toads also feed on termites, small beetles, and other various arthropods. These various arthropods make up to 75% of their diet, though other prey may include small snails, spiders, mites, collembolans, and lepidopterans. Eastern narrow-mouth toads have a distinct skin fold on their upper neck, directly behind their eyes, that folds over to cover their eyes. This is hypothesized to be a protective mechanism against ant bites while feeding. The species primarily consumes nocturnal or crepuscular ant species, reflecting its own nocturnal activity patterns.

== Defensive behavior ==
The eastern narrowmouth toad is preyed upon by a variety of organisms. Their first reaction is to burrow out of sight or find a hiding area nearby. However, Gastrophryne carolinensis has been observed using irritating and noxious integumentary secretions as a defense mechanism to discourage predators when caught. In a study on the unpalatability of their skin, eastern narrowmouth toads were refused by predator species significantly more often than the study's control frog species. The species is generally most vulnerable as larvae and tadpoles to fish and salamanders. As adults the toxin secreted by the granular gland makes them not a preferred prey of vertebrates.

== Life history and behavior ==
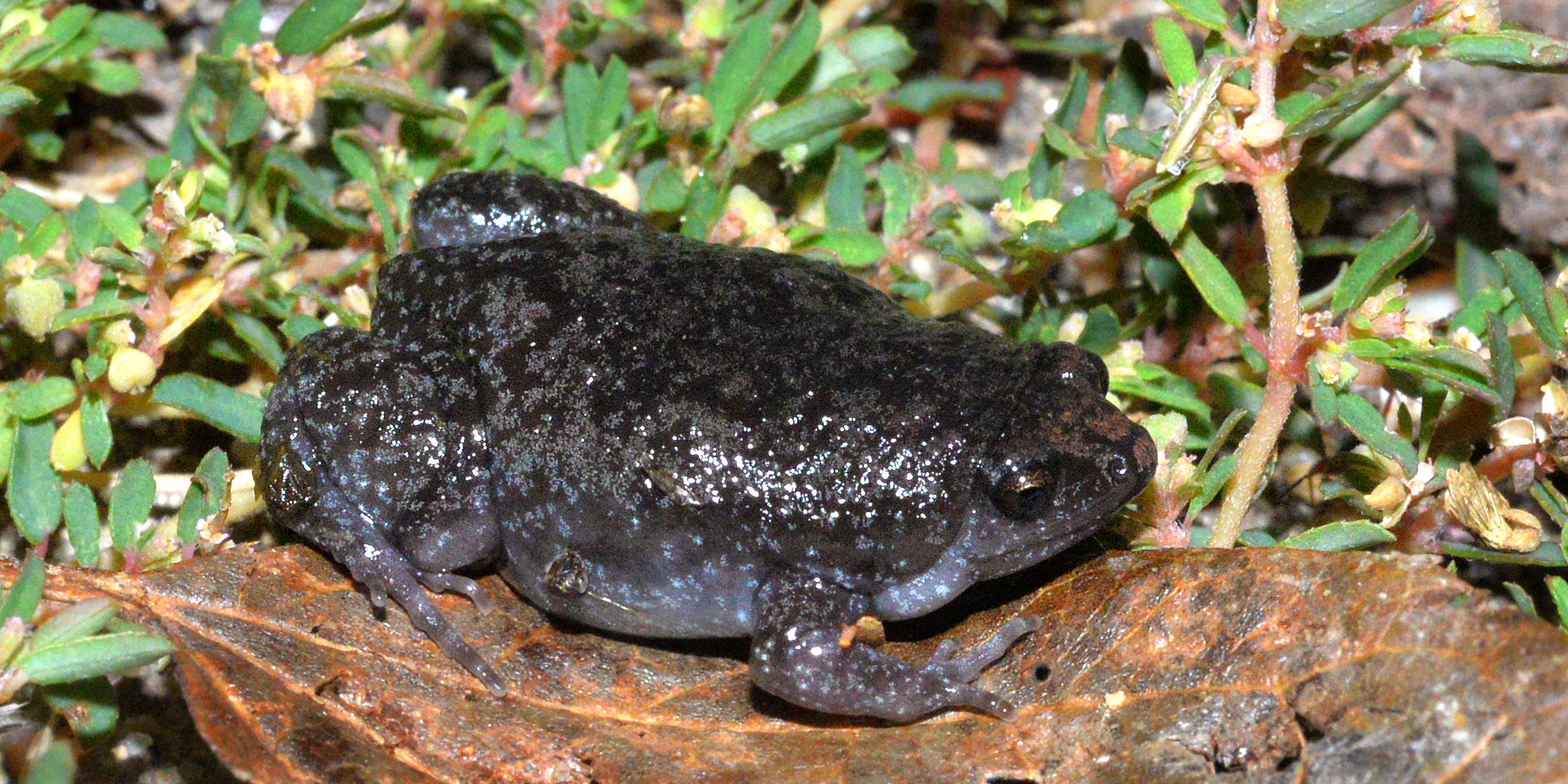
Eastern Narrow-mouth Toad, (Gastrophryne carolinensis) Liberty Co. Texas, USA

Gastrophyryne carolinensis toads are weak jumpers, thus either run or move by short and rapid hops. In general, the males move more than the females. These toads are mainly nocturnal, and generally remain under ground or hidden in debris during the day.

As a tadpole, fish are their main predator, primarily mosquito fish, while as adults, their predator list is reported to include the copperhead (Agkistrodon contortrix) and the common garter snakes (Thamnophis sirtalis). Other known predators include the glossy watersnakes (Liodytes rigida), the eastern cottonmouth (Agkistrodon piscivorus), and the cattle egret (Bubulcus ibis). This particular toad species avoids predators by burrowing, seeking cover, and/or nocturnal activity patterns. Chemically, they are also capable of producing mucus that produces a violent burning sensation and irritates membranes. The toxins secreted from their skin deter predators, but they also plays a role in inhibiting ant attacks when individuals forage near ant mounds.

These toads are accomplished burrowers, and are seldom seen on the surface due to their nocturnal nature. Though they may be present in large numbers, their existence is hardly suspected. Though they are not known to establish territories, their mating calling positions can be as close as 2 cm, or as distant as several meters apart.

== Fossil record ==
A few fossils belonging to the Miocene epoch have been found in Florida. The ilia of Gastrophryne are very distinctive and different from other small anurans. Based on observances of the different developmental features of the ilium between G. carolinensis and G. olivacea, the two species could have differentiated from the early Miocene.

== Conservation status ==
According to the IUCN Red List category and criteria, Gastrophryne carolinensis is listed as a species of least concern due to its presumed large population, wide distribution, and ability to adapt to various habitats. Thus, no conservation actions are currently needed, though the population in Maryland is protected as an endangered species. One potential threat to the conservation of the species is copper contamination in wetland habitats. G. carolinensis has been found to be particularly sensitive. Copper and other mineral toxicity is often a result of mining runoff.
