= List of types of equilibrium =

This is a list presents the various articles at Wikipedia that use the term equilibrium (or an associated prefix or derivative) in their titles or leads. It is not necessarily complete; further examples may be found by using the Wikipedia search function, and this term.

== Biology ==
- Equilibrioception, the sense of a balance present in human beings and animals
- Equilibrium unfolding, the process of unfolding a protein or RNA molecule by gradually changing its environment
- Genetic equilibrium, theoretical state in which a population is not evolving
- Homeostasis, the ability of an open system, especially living organisms, to regulate its internal environment
- Punctuated equilibrium, theory in evolutionary biology
- Sedimentation equilibrium, analytical ultracentrifugation method for measuring protein molecular masses in solution
- Equilibrium Theory (Island biogeography), MacArthur-Wilson theory explaining biodiversity character of ecological islands
- Osmotic equilibrium, balance between solvent flow and pressure across a membrane

== Physics ==
- Equilibrant force, which keeps any object motionless and acts on virtually every object in the world that is not moving
- Equilibrium mode distribution, the state of fiber optic or waveguide transmission in which the propagation mode does not vary with distance along the fiber or changes in the launch mode
- Hydrostatic equilibrium, the state of a system in which compression due to gravity is balanced by a pressure gradient force
- Hyperbolic equilibrium point, a mathematical concept in physics
- Mechanical equilibrium, the state in which the sum of the forces, and torque, on each particle of the system is zero
- Radiative equilibrium, the state where the energy radiated is balanced by the energy absorbed
- Secular equilibrium, a state of radioactive elements in which the production rate of a daughter nucleus is balanced by its own decay rate
- Thermodynamic equilibrium, the state of a thermodynamic system in which there are no net flows of matter or energy

== Chemistry ==
- Chemical equilibrium, the state in which the concentrations of the reactants and products have stopped changing in time
- Diffusive equilibrium, when the concentrations of each type of particle have stopped changing
- Thermal equilibrium, a state where an object and its surroundings cease to exchange energy in the form of heat, i.e. they are at the same temperature
- Donnan equilibrium, the distribution of ion species between two ionic solutions separated by a semipermeable membrane or boundary
- Dynamic equilibrium, the state in which two reversible processes occur at the same rate
- Equilibrium constant, a quantity characterizing a chemical equilibrium in a chemical reaction
- Partition equilibrium, a type of chromatography that is typically used in GC
- Quasistatic equilibrium, the quasi-balanced state of a thermodynamic system near to equilibrium in some sense or degree
- Schlenk equilibrium, a chemical equilibrium named after its discoverer Wilhelm Schlenk taking place in solutions of Grignard reagents
- Solubility equilibrium, any chemical equilibrium between solid and dissolved states of a compound at saturation
- Vapor–liquid equilibrium, where the rates of condensation and vapourization of a material are equal

== Economics ==
- Competitive equilibrium, economic equilibrium when all buyers and sellers are small relative to the market
- Economic equilibrium, the situation in a system under examination where the economic forces of supply and demand are balanced
- Equilibrium price, the price at which quantity supplied equals quantity demanded
- General equilibrium theory, a branch of theoretical microeconomics that studies multiple individual markets
- Intertemporal equilibrium, an equilibrium concept over time
- Lindahl equilibrium, a method proposed by Erik Lindahl for financing public goods
- Partial equilibrium, the equilibrium price and quantity which come from the cross of supply and demand in a competitive market
- Radner equilibrium, an economic concept defined by economist Roy Radner in the context of general equilibrium
- Recursive competitive equilibrium, an economic equilibrium concept associated with a dynamic program
- Static equilibrium (economics), the intersection of supply and demand in any market
- Sunspot equilibrium, an economic equilibrium in which non-fundamental factors affect prices or quantities
- Underemployment equilibrium, a situation in Keynesian economics with a persistent shortfall relative to full employment and potential output
- Dynamic stochastic general equilibrium, an econometric method that applies general equilibrium theory and microeconomic principles.

== Mathematics ==
- Correlated equilibrium, in game theory, a solution concept that is more general than Nash equilibrium
- Equilibrium point, in mathematics, a constant solution to a differential equation
- Nash equilibrium, the basic solution concept in game theory
- Quasi-perfect equilibrium, in game theory, a refinement of Nash Equilibrium for extensive form games
- Sequential equilibrium, in game theory, a refinement of Nash Equilibrium for games of incomplete information
- Perfect Bayesian equilibrium, in game theory, a refinement of Nash equilibrium for games of incomplete information, simpler than sequential equilibrium
- Symmetric equilibrium, in game theory, an equilibrium arising from all players using the same strategy
- Trembling hand perfect equilibrium, in game theory, an equilibrium arising from players that "slip up" and choose unintended strategies
- Proper equilibrium in game theory, an equilibrium, a subset of trembling hand, arising when players make costly trembles with lower probabilities

== Planetary sciences (including geology) ==
- Hydrostatic equilibrium, the state of a system in which compression due to gravity is balanced by a pressure gradient force
- Isostatic equilibrium, in geology, the balance between gravitation and buoyancy of the Earth's crust in the mantle

== Other ==
- Social equilibrium, a system in which there is a dynamic working balance among its interdependent parts
- Equilibrium moisture content, the moisture content at which the wood is neither gaining nor losing moisture
- Reflective equilibrium, the state of balance or coherence among a set of beliefs arrived at by a process of deliberative mutual adjustment

== See also ==
- Balance (disambiguation)
- Equilibrium (disambiguation)
- Stability (disambiguation)
