= Pierpaolo Battigalli =

Italian economist (born 1961)

- Born: June 18, 1961 (age 65)

Academic background
- Education: Bocconi University; University of Milan; Catholic University of Milan

Academic work
- Discipline: Game theory, Behavioral economics, Decision theory
- Institutions: Bocconi University; Princeton University
- Notable ideas: Epistemic game theory, Dynamic psychological games
- Website: Information at IDEAS / RePEc

Pierpaolo Battigalli (born June 18, 1961) is an Italian economist. He is a professor at Bocconi University, in Milan, and is associated with the IGIER. He does research in microeconomic theory, in particular the epistemic foundations of game theory and psychological games.

Battigalli is a fellow of the Econometric Society and the Game Theory Society. Since 2021 he is one of the editors of the Journal of Economic Theory.

== Biography ==
=== Life and education ===
Battigalli was born on June 18, 1961, in Milan. He went to highschool at the liceo Vittorio Veneto, where he was involved in student politics and first became interested in social sciences. He received his BA in economics at Bocconi University under the supervision of Aldo Montesano in 1987. His undergraduate thesis was in game theory, where he independently developed solution concepts related to David Pearce's extensive-form rationazalibility, and Fudenberg and Levine's self-confirming equilibrium.

Battigalli went on to do his master's in econometrics and mathematical economics at the London School of Economics in 1989. In 1990 he returned to Italy for his PhD, which he finished in 1992 at a joint economics program at Bocconi, University of Milan, and the Catholic University of Milan.

=== Career ===
Battigalli was an assistant professor at the Polytechnic University of Milan from 1992 to 1994. From 1994 to 1999, he was an assistant professor at Princeton University. He returned to Italy in 1998: he was a professor at the European University Institute in Florence until 2000, and has since been a professor at Bocconi University.

At Bocconi, he has been director of the PhD Program in Economics, Dean of the PhD School, and Head of the Department of Decision Sciences.

== Research ==
=== Epistemic game theory ===
Battigalli has done foundational research on epistemic game theory, a sub-field of game theory which studies how players' hierarchies of beliefs affect strategic behavior. Together with Marciano Siniscalchi he has developed the game-theoretic notion of strong belief, which they used as an epistemic foundation for forward-induction reasoning in games. Another contribution with Siniscalchi is the construction of the "universal type space" of hiearchies of conditional probability systems, an extensive-form generalization of Mertens and Zamir's hierarchies of beliefs.

=== Psychological game theory ===
Battigalli has also contributed substantially to the sub-field of psychological games. Based on his work on dynamic interactive epistemology from epistemic game theory, his papers with Martin Dufwenberg have laid the foundations for dynamic psychological games, with applications such as modelling guilt and frustration.
