= Trembling hand perfect equilibrium =

Variant of Nash equilibrium in game theory

(Normal form) trembling hand perfect equilibrium
- Solution concept in game theory

Relationship
- Subset of: Nash Equilibrium
- Superset of: Proper equilibrium

Significance
- Proposed by: Reinhard Selten

In game theory, trembling hand perfect equilibrium, or simply perfect equilibrium, is a type of refinement of a Nash equilibrium that was first proposed by Reinhard Selten. A trembling hand perfect equilibrium is an equilibrium that takes the possibility of off-the-equilibrium play into account by assuming that the players, through a "slip of the hand" or tremble, may choose unintended strategies, albeit with negligible probability.

== Definition ==
First define a perturbed game. A perturbed game is a copy of a base game, with the restriction that only totally mixed strategies are allowed to be played. A totally mixed strategy is a mixed strategy in an $n$-player strategic game where every pure strategy is played with positive probability. This is the "trembling hands" of the players; they sometimes play a different strategy, other than the one they intended to play. Then define a mixed strategy profile $\sigma=(\sigma_1,\ldots,\sigma_n)$ as being trembling hand perfect if there is a sequence of perturbed games strategy profiles $\{\sigma^k\}_{k=1,2,\ldots}$ that converges to $\sigma$ such that for every $k$ and every player $1\leq i \leq n$ the strategy $\sigma_i$ is the best reply to $\sigma^k_{-i}$.

Note: All completely mixed Nash equilibria are perfect.

Note 2: The mixed strategy extension of any finite normal-form game has at least one perfect equilibrium.

== Example ==
The game represented in the following normal form matrix has two pure strategies Nash equilibria, namely $\langle \text{Up}, \text{Left}\rangle$ and $\langle \text{Down}, \text{Right}\rangle$. However, only $\langle \text{U},\text{L}\rangle$ is trembling-hand perfect.

	Left	Right
Up	1, 1	2, 0
Down	0, 2	2, 2
Trembling hand perfect equilibrium

Assume player 1 (the row player) is playing a mixed strategy $(1-\varepsilon, \varepsilon)$, for $0<\varepsilon <1$.

Player 2's expected payoff from playing L is:

$$1(1-\varepsilon) + 2\varepsilon = 1+\varepsilon$$

Player 2's expected payoff from playing the strategy R is:

$$0(1-\varepsilon) + 2\varepsilon = 2\varepsilon$$

For small values of $\varepsilon$, player 2 maximizes his expected payoff by placing a minimal weight on R and a maximal weight on L. By symmetry, player 1 should place a minimal weight on D and a maximal weight on U if player 2 is playing the mixed strategy $(1-\varepsilon, \varepsilon)$. Hence $\langle \text{U},\text{L}\rangle$ is trembling-hand perfect.

However, a similar analysis fails for the strategy profile $\langle \text{D}, \text{R}\rangle$.

Assume player 2 is playing a mixed strategy $(\varepsilon, 1-\varepsilon)$. Player 1's expected payoff from playing U is:

$$1\varepsilon + 2(1-\varepsilon) = 2-\varepsilon$$

Player 1's expected payoff from playing D is:

$$0\varepsilon + 2(1-\varepsilon) = 2-2\varepsilon$$

For all positive values of $\varepsilon$, player 1 maximizes his expected payoff by placing a minimal weight on D and maximal weight on U. Hence $\langle \text{D}, \text{R}\rangle$ is not trembling-hand perfect because player 2 (and, by symmetry, player 1) maximizes his expected payoff by deviating most often to L if there is a small chance of error in the behavior of player 1.

== Equilibria of two-player games ==
For 2×2 games, the set of trembling-hand perfect equilibria coincides with the set of equilibria consisting of two undominated strategies. In the example above, we see that the equilibrium <Down,Right> is imperfect, as Left (weakly) dominates Right for Player 2 and Up (weakly) dominates Down for Player 1.

== Equilibria of extensive form games ==
Extensive-form trembling hand perfect equilibrium
- Solution concept in game theory

Relationship
- Subset of: Subgame perfect equilibrium, Perfect Bayesian equilibrium, Sequential equilibrium

Significance
- Proposed by: Reinhard Selten
- Used for: Extensive form games

There are two possible ways of extending the definition of trembling hand perfection to extensive form games.

- One may interpret the extensive form as being merely a concise description of a normal form game and apply the concepts described above to this normal form game. In the resulting perturbed games, every strategy of the extensive-form game must be played with non-zero probability. This leads to the notion of a normal-form trembling hand perfect equilibrium.
- Alternatively, one may recall that trembles are to be interpreted as modelling mistakes made by the players with some negligible probability when the game is played. Such a mistake would most likely consist of a player making another move than the one intended at some point during play. It would hardly consist of the player choosing another strategy than intended, i.e. a wrong plan for playing the entire game. To capture this, one may define the perturbed game by requiring that every move at every information set is taken with non-zero probability. Limits of equilibria of such perturbed games as the tremble probabilities go to zero are called extensive-form trembling hand perfect equilibria.

The notions of normal-form and extensive-form trembling hand perfect equilibria are incomparable, i.e., an equilibrium of an extensive-form game may be normal-form trembling hand perfect but not extensive-form trembling hand perfect and vice versa. As an extreme example of this, Jean-François Mertens has given an example of a two-player extensive form game where no extensive-form trembling hand perfect equilibrium is admissible, i.e., the sets of extensive-form and normal-form trembling hand perfect equilibria for this game are disjoint.

An extensive-form trembling hand perfect equilibrium is also a sequential equilibrium. A normal-form trembling hand perfect equilibrium of an extensive form game may be sequential but is not necessarily so. In fact, a normal-form trembling hand perfect equilibrium does not even have to be subgame perfect.

== Problems with perfection ==
Myerson (1978) pointed out that perfection is sensitive to the addition of a strictly dominated strategy, and instead proposed another refinement, known as proper equilibrium.
