= Information set =

Information set may refer to:

- Information set (game theory), in game theory, a set that, for a particular player, establishes all the possible moves that could have taken place in the game so far, given what that player has observed
- XML Information Set or Infoset, a W3C specification dealing with XML documents
