= Sequential equilibrium =

Refinement of Nash equilibrium

- Solution concept in game theory

Relationship
- Subset of: Subgame perfect equilibrium, perfect Bayesian equilibrium
- Superset of: extensive-form trembling hand perfect equilibrium, Quasi-perfect equilibrium

Significance
- Proposed by: David M. Kreps and Robert Wilson
- Used for: Extensive form games

Sequential equilibrium is a refinement of Nash equilibrium for extensive form games due to David M. Kreps and Robert Wilson. A sequential equilibrium specifies not only a strategy for each of the players but also a belief for each of the players. A belief gives, for each information set of the game belonging to the player, a probability distribution on the nodes in the information set. A profile of strategies and beliefs is called an assessment for the game. Informally speaking, an assessment is a perfect Bayesian equilibrium if its strategies are sensible given its beliefs and its beliefs are confirmed on the outcome path given by its strategies. The definition of sequential equilibrium further requires that there be arbitrarily small perturbations of beliefs and associated strategies with the same property.

== Consistent assessments ==
The formal definition of a strategy being sensible given a belief is straightforward; the strategy should simply maximize expected payoff in every information set. It is also straightforward to define what a sensible belief should be for those information sets that are reached with positive probability given the strategies; the beliefs should be the conditional probability distribution on the nodes of the information set, given that it is reached. This entails the application of Bayes' rule.

It is far from straightforward to define what a sensible belief should be for those information sets that are reached with probability zero, given the strategies. Indeed, this is the main conceptual contribution of Kreps and Wilson. Their consistency requirement is the following: The assessment should be a limit point of a sequence of totally mixed strategy profiles and associated sensible beliefs, in the above straightforward sense.

== Relationship to other equilibrium refinements ==
Sequential equilibrium is a further refinement of subgame perfect equilibrium and even perfect Bayesian equilibrium. It is itself refined by extensive-form trembling hand perfect equilibrium and proper equilibrium. Strategies of sequential equilibria (or even extensive-form trembling hand perfect equilibria) are not necessarily admissible. A refinement of sequential equilibrium that guarantees admissibility is quasi-perfect equilibrium.
