= Purification theorem =

Mixed strategy equilibria explained as the limit of pure strategy equilibria

In game theory, the purification theorem was contributed by Nobel laureate John Harsanyi in 1973. The theorem justifies a puzzling aspect of mixed strategy Nash equilibria: each player is wholly indifferent between each of the actions he puts non-zero weight on, yet he mixes them so as to make every other player also indifferent.

The purification theorem shows how such mixed strategy equilibria can emerge even if each player plays a pure strategy, so long as players have incomplete information about the payoffs of their opponents. Such strategies arise as the limit of a series of pure strategy equilibria for a disturbed game of incomplete information, in which the payoffs of each player are known to themselves but not their opponents. The idea is that the predicted mixed strategy of the original game emerges from the ever-improving approximations of a game which is not observed by the theorist who designed the original, idealized game.

The apparently mixed nature of the strategy is actually just the result of each player playing a pure strategy with threshold values that depend on the ex-ante distribution over the continuum of payoffs that a player can have. As that continuum shrinks to zero, the players' strategies converge to the predicted Nash equilibria of the original, unperturbed, complete information game.

The result is also an important aspect of modern-day inquiries in evolutionary game theory where the perturbed values are interpreted as distributions over types of players randomly paired in a population to play games.

== Example ==
	C	D
C	3, 3	2, 4
D	4, 2	0, 0
Fig. 1: a Hawk–Dove game

Consider the Hawk–Dove game shown here. The game has two pure strategy equilibria (Defect, Cooperate) and (Cooperate, Defect). It also has a mixed equilibrium in which each player plays Cooperate with probability 2/3.

Suppose that each player i bears an extra cost a_{i} from playing Cooperate, which is uniformly distributed on [−A, A]. Players only know their own value of this cost. So this is a game of incomplete information which we can solve using Bayesian Nash equilibrium. The probability that a_{i} ≤ a* is (a* + A)/2A. If player 2 Cooperates when a_{2} ≤ a*, then player 1's expected utility from Cooperating is −a_{1} + 3(a* + A)/2A + 2(1 − (a* + A)/2A); his expected utility from Defecting is 4(a* + A)/2A. He should therefore himself Cooperate when a_{1} ≤ 2 - 3(a*+A)/2A. Seeking a symmetric equilibrium where both players cooperate if a_{i} ≤ a*, we solve this for a* = 1/(2 + 3/A). Now we have worked out a*, we can calculate the probability of each player playing Cooperate as

$$\Pr(a_i \le a^*) = \frac{\frac{1}{2+3/A}+A}{2A} = \frac{A}{4A^{2}+6A}+\frac{1}{2}.$$

As A → 0, this approaches 2/3 – the same probability as in the mixed strategy in the complete information game.

Thus, we can think of the mixed strategy equilibrium as the outcome of pure strategies followed by players who have a small amount of private information about their payoffs.

== Technical details ==
Harsanyi's proof involves the strong assumption that the perturbations for each player are independent of the other players. However, further refinements to make the theorem more general have been attempted.

The main result of the theorem is that all the mixed strategy equilibria of a given game can be purified using the same sequence of perturbed games. However, in addition to independence of the perturbations, it relies on the set of payoffs for this sequence of games being of full measure. There are games, of a pathological nature, for which this condition fails to hold.

The main problem with these games falls into one of two categories: (1) various mixed strategies of the game are purified by different sequences of perturbed games and (2) some mixed strategies of the game involve weakly dominated strategies. No mixed strategy involving a weakly dominated strategy can be purified using this method because if there is ever any non-negative probability that the opponent will play a strategy for which the weakly dominated strategy is not a best response, then one will never wish to play the weakly dominated strategy. Hence, the limit fails to hold because it involves a discontinuity.
