= Françoise Forges =

Belgian and French economist and game theorist

Françoise Forges (born 3 July 1958) is a Belgian and French economist known for her work in game theory. She is professor of economics at Paris Dauphine University.

== Education and career ==
Forges was born on 3 July 1958 in Brussels, but is a French citizen. She studied mathematics at the Université catholique de Louvain, earning a licenciate in 1980 and completing her doctorate there in 1984, advised by Jean-François Mertens. She earned a habilitation at Paris 1 Panthéon-Sorbonne University in 1992.

She became a researcher for the Belgian National Fund for Scientific Research (FNRS) from 1981 until 1985. After postdoctoral research for the Mathematical Sciences Research Institute in Berkeley, California from 1985 to 1986, she returned to research at the FNRS and the Université catholique de Louvain until 1994, when she became a professor of economics at Cergy-Pontoise University in France. In 2003 she moved to her position as a professor at Paris Dauphine University, where she was named as an "exceptional class" professor in 2006 and "second echelon" in 2009.

== Recognition ==
Forges was named a junior member of the Institut Universitaire de France for 1997–2002, and a full member for 2011–2016. She has been a Fellow of the Econometric Society since 1997, and in 2020 was named as an international member of the American Academy of Arts and Sciences.

In 2009 she won the CNRS Silver Medal.
