= Matching pennies =

Simple game studied in game theory

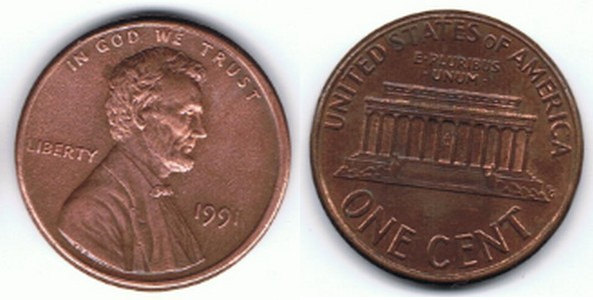
If one penny is heads and the other tails, Odd wins and keeps both coins

Matching pennies is a non-cooperative game studied in game theory. It is played between two players, Even and Odd. Each player has a penny and must secretly turn the penny to heads or tails. The players then reveal their choices simultaneously. If the pennies match (both heads or both tails), then Even wins and keeps both pennies. If the pennies do not match (one heads and one tails), then Odd wins and keeps both pennies.

== Theory ==
	Heads	Tails
Heads	+1, −1	−1, +1
Tails	−1, +1	+1, −1
Matching pennies

Matching Pennies is a zero-sum game because each participant's gain or loss of utility is exactly balanced by the losses or gains of the utility of the other participants. If the participants' total gains are added up and their total losses subtracted, the sum will be zero.

The game can be written in a payoff matrix (pictured right - from Even's point of view). Each cell of the matrix shows the two players' payoffs, with Even's payoffs listed first.

Matching pennies is used primarily to illustrate the concept of mixed strategies and a mixed strategy Nash equilibrium.

This game has no pure strategy Nash equilibrium since there is no pure strategy (heads or tails) that is a best response to a best response. In other words, there is no pair of pure strategies such that neither player would want to switch if told what the other would do. Instead, the unique Nash equilibrium of this game is in mixed strategies: each player chooses heads or tails with equal probability. In this way, each player makes the other indifferent between choosing heads or tails, so neither player has an incentive to try another strategy. The best-response functions for mixed strategies are depicted in Figure 1 below:

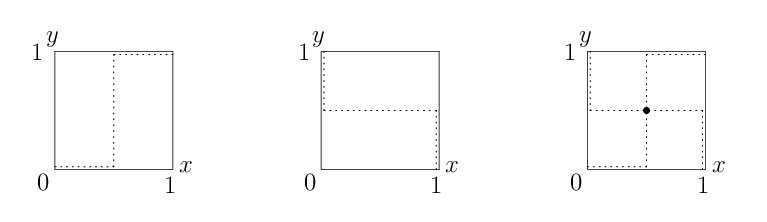
Figure 1. Best response correspondences for players in the matching pennies game. The leftmost mapping is for the Even player, the middle shows the mapping for the Odd player. The sole Nash equilibrium is shown in the right hand graph. x is a probability of playing heads by Odd player, y is a probability of playing heads by Even. The unique intersection is the only point where the strategy of Even is the best response to the strategy of Odd and vice versa.

When either player plays the equilibrium, everyone's expected payoff is zero.

=== Variants ===
	Heads	Tails
Heads	+7, -1	-1, +1
Tails	-1, +1	+1, -1
Matching pennies

Varying the payoffs in the matrix can change the equilibrium point. For example, in the table shown on the right, Even has a chance to win 7 if both he and Odd play Heads. To calculate the equilibrium point in this game, note that a player playing a mixed strategy must be indifferent between his two actions (otherwise he would switch to a pure strategy). This gives us two equations:

- For the Even player, the expected payoff when playing Heads is $+7\cdot x -1\cdot (1-x)$ and when playing Tails $-1\cdot x +1\cdot (1-x)$ (where $x$ is Odd's probability of playing Heads), and these must be equal, so $x=0.2$.
- For the Odd player, the expected payoff when playing Heads is $+1\cdot y -1\cdot (1-y)$ and when playing Tails $-1\cdot y +1\cdot (1-y)$ (where $y$ is Even's probability of playing Heads), and these must be equal, so $y=0.5$.

Note that since $x$ is the Heads-probability of Odd and $y$ is the Heads-probability of Even, the change in Even's payoff affects Odd's equilibrium strategy and not Even's own equilibrium strategy. This may be unintuitive at first. The reasoning is that in equilibrium, the choices must be equally appealing. The +7 possibility for Even is very appealing relative to +1, so to maintain equilibrium, Odd's play must lower the probability of that outcome to compensate and equalize the expected values of the two choices, meaning in equilibrium Odd will play Heads less often and Tails more often.

== Laboratory experiments ==
Human players do not always play the equilibrium strategy. Laboratory experiments reveal several factors that make players deviate from the equilibrium strategy, especially if matching pennies is played repeatedly:

- Humans are not good at randomizing. They may try to produce "random" sequences by switching their actions from Heads to Tails and vice versa, but they switch their actions too often (due to a gambler's fallacy). This makes it possible for expert players to predict their next actions with more than 50% chance of success. In this way, a positive expected payoff might be attainable.
- Humans are trained to detect patterns. They try to detect patterns in the opponent's sequence, even when such patterns do not exist, and adjust their strategy accordingly.
- Humans' behavior is affected by framing effects. When the Odd player is named "the misleader" and the Even player is named "the guesser", the former focuses on trying to randomize and the latter focuses on trying to detect a pattern, and this increases the chances of success of the guesser. Additionally, the fact that Even wins when there is a match gives him an advantage, since people are better at matching than at mismatching (due to the stimulus-response compatibility effect).

Moreover, when the payoff matrix is asymmetric, other factors influence human behavior even when the game is not repeated:

- Players tend to increase the probability of playing an action which gives them a higher payoff, e.g. in the payoff matrix above, Even will tend to play more Heads. This is intuitively understandable, but it is not a Nash equilibrium: as explained above, the mixing probability of a player should depend only on the other player's payoff, not his own payoff. This deviation can be explained as a quantal response equilibrium. In a quantal-response-equilibrium, the best-response curves are not sharp as in a standard Nash equilibrium. Rather, they change smoothly from the action whose probability is 0 to the action whose probability 1 (in other words, while in a Nash-equilibrium, a player chooses the best response with probability 1 and the worst response with probability 0, in a quantal-response-equilibrium the player chooses the best response with high probability that is smaller than 1 and the worst response with smaller probability that is higher than 0). The equilibrium point is the intersection point of the smoothed curves of the two players, which is different from the Nash-equilibrium point.
- The own-payoff effects are mitigated by risk aversion. Players tend to underestimate high gains and overestimate high losses; this moves the quantal-response curves and changes the quantal-response-equilibrium point. This apparently contradicts theoretical results regarding the irrelevance of risk-aversion in finitely-repeated zero-sum games.

== Real-life data ==
The conclusions of laboratory experiments have been criticized on several grounds.

- Games in lab experiments are artificial and simplistic and do not mimic real-life behavior.
- The payoffs in lab experiments are small, so subjects do not have much incentive to play optimally. In real life, the market may punish such irrationality and cause players to behave more rationally.
- Subjects have other considerations besides maximizing monetary payoffs, such as to avoid looking foolish or to please the experimenter.
- Lab experiments are short and subjects do not have sufficient time to learn the optimal strategy.

To overcome these difficulties, several authors have done statistical analyses of professional sports games. These are zero-sum games with very high payoffs, and the players have devoted their lives to become experts. Often such games are strategically similar to matching pennies:

- In soccer penalty kicks, the kicker has two options – kick left or kick right – and the goalie has two options – jump left or jump right. The kicker's probability of scoring a goal is higher when the choices do not match, and lower when the choices match. In general, the payoffs are asymmetric because each kicker has a stronger leg (usually the right leg) and his chances are better when kicking to the opposite direction (left). In a close examination of the actions of kickers and goalies, it was found that their actions do not deviate significantly from the prediction of a Nash equilibrium.
- In tennis serve-and-return plays, the situation is similar. It was found that the win rates are consistent with the minimax hypothesis, but the players' choices are not random: even professional tennis players are not good at randomizing, and switch their actions too often.

== See also ==
- Odds and evens - a game with the same strategic structure, that is played with fingers instead of coins.
- Rock paper scissors - a similar game in which each player has three strategies instead of two.
- Parity game - a much more complicated two-player logic game, played on a colored graph.
- Penney's game - an exploitable sequence game
