= Move by nature =

Term in game theory

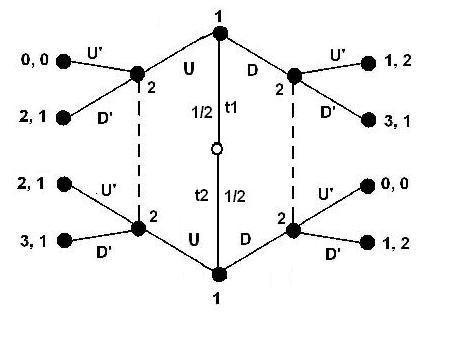
A signaling game which begins with a move by nature.

In game theory a move by nature is a decision or move in an extensive form game made by a player who has no strategic interests in the outcome. The effect is to add a player, "Nature", whose practical role is to act as a random number generator. For instance, if a game of Poker requires a dealer to choose which cards a player is dealt, the dealer plays the role of the nature player.

Moves by nature are an integral part of games of incomplete information.

== See also ==
- Games of chance
