= Quasi-perfect equilibrium =

Solution concept in game theory

Quasi-perfect Equilibrium
- Solution concept in game theory

Relationship
- Subset of: Sequential equilibrium, normal-form trembling hand perfect equilibrium

Significance
- Proposed by: Eric van Damme
- Used for: Extensive form games
- Example: Mertens' voting game

Quasi-perfect equilibrium is a refinement of Nash Equilibrium for extensive form games due to Eric van Damme.

Informally, a player playing by a strategy from a quasi-perfect equilibrium takes observed as well as potential future mistakes of his opponents into account but assumes that he himself will not make a mistake in the future, even if he observes that he has done so in the past.

Quasi-perfect equilibrium is a further refinement of sequential equilibrium. It is itself refined by normal form proper equilibrium.

== Mertens' voting game ==
It has been argued by Jean-François Mertens that quasi-perfect equilibrium is superior to Reinhard Selten's notion of extensive-form trembling hand perfect equilibrium as a quasi-perfect equilibrium is guaranteed to describe admissible behavior. In contrast, for a certain two-player voting game no extensive-form trembling hand perfect equilibrium describes admissible behavior for both players.

The voting game suggested by Mertens may be described as follows:

- Two players must elect one of them to perform an effortless task. The task may be performed either correctly or incorrectly. If it is performed correctly, both players receive a payoff of 1, otherwise both players receive a payoff of 0. The election is by a secret vote. If both players vote for the same player, that player gets to perform the task. If each player votes for himself, the player to perform the task is chosen at random but is not told that he was elected this way. Finally, if each player votes for the other, the task is performed by somebody else, with no possibility of it being performed incorrectly.

In the unique quasi-perfect equilibrium for the game, each player votes for himself and, if elected, performs the task correctly. This is also the unique admissible behavior. But in any extensive-form trembling hand perfect equilibrium, at least one of the players believes that he is at least as likely as the other player to tremble and perform the task incorrectly and hence votes for the other player.

The example illustrates that being a limit of equilibria of perturbed games, an extensive-form trembling hand perfect equilibrium implicitly assumes an agreement between the players about the relative magnitudes of future trembles. It also illustrates that such an assumption may be unwarranted and undesirable.
