= Self-confirming equilibrium =

Aspect of game theory

- Solution concept in game theory

Relationship
- Subset of: Rationalizability
- Superset of: Nash equilibrium

Significance
- Proposed by: Drew Fudenberg and David K. Levine
- Used for: Extensive-form games

In game theory, self-confirming equilibrium is a generalization of Nash equilibrium for extensive form games, in which players correctly predict the moves their opponents make, but may have misconceptions about what their opponents would do at information sets that are never reached when the equilibrium is played. Self-confirming equilibrium is motivated by the idea that if a game is played repeatedly, the players will revise their beliefs about their opponents' play if and only if they observe these beliefs to be wrong.

Consistent self-confirming equilibrium is a refinement of self-confirming equilibrium that further requires that each player correctly predicts play at all information sets that can be reached when the player's opponents, but not the player itself, deviate from their equilibrium strategies. Consistent self-confirming equilibrium is motivated by learning models in which players are occasionally matched with "crazy" opponents, so that even if they stick to their equilibrium strategy themselves, they eventually learn the distribution of play at all information sets that can be reached if their opponents deviate.
