= Proper equilibrium =

Solution concept in game theory

- Solution concept in game theory

Relationship
- Subset of: Trembling hand perfect equilibrium

Significance
- Proposed by: Roger B. Myerson

Proper equilibrium in game theory is a refinement of Nash Equilibrium by Roger B. Myerson. Proper equilibrium further refines Reinhard Selten's notion of a trembling hand perfect equilibrium by assuming that more costly trembles are made with significantly smaller probability than less costly ones.

== Definition ==
Given a normal form game and a parameter $\epsilon > 0$, a totally mixed strategy profile $\sigma$ is defined to be $\epsilon$-proper if, whenever a player has two pure strategies s and s' such that the expected payoff of playing s is smaller than the expected payoff of playing s' (that is $u(s,\sigma_{-i})<u(s',\sigma_{-i})$), then the probability assigned to s is at most $\epsilon$ times the probability assigned to s'.

The strategy profile of the game is said to be a proper equilibrium if it is a limit point, as $\epsilon$ approaches 0, of a sequence of $\epsilon$-proper strategy profiles.

== Example ==
The game to the right is a variant of Matching Pennies.

Matching Pennies with a twist
	Guess heads up	Guess tails up	Grab penny
Hide heads up	−1, 1	0, 0	−1, 1
Hide tails up	0, 0	−1, 1	−1, 1

Player 1 (row player) hides a penny and if Player 2 (column player) guesses correctly whether it is heads up or tails up, he gets the penny. In this variant, Player 2 has a third option: grabbing the penny without guessing. The Nash equilibria of the game are the strategy profiles where Player 2 grabs the penny with probability 1. Any mixed strategy of Player 1 is in (Nash) equilibrium with this pure strategy of Player 2. Any such pair is even trembling hand perfect. Intuitively, since Player 1 expects Player 2 to grab the penny, he is not concerned about leaving Player 2 uncertain about whether it is heads up or tails up. However, it can be seen that the unique proper equilibrium of this game is the one where Player 1 hides the penny heads up with probability 1/2 and tails up with probability 1/2 (and Player 2 grabs the penny). This unique proper equilibrium can be motivated intuitively as follows: Player 1 fully expects Player 2 to grab the penny. However, Player 1 still prepares for the unlikely event that Player 2 does not grab the penny and instead for some reason decides to make a guess. Player 1 prepares for this event by making sure that Player 2 has no information about whether the penny is heads up or tails up, exactly as in the original Matching Pennies game.

== Proper equilibria of extensive games ==
One may apply the properness notion to extensive form games in two different ways, completely analogous to the two different ways trembling hand perfection is applied to extensive games. This leads to the notions of normal form proper equilibrium and extensive form proper equilibrium of an extensive form game. It was shown by van Damme that a normal form proper equilibrium of an extensive form game is behaviorally equivalent to a quasi-perfect equilibrium of that game.
