= Extensive-form game =

Wide-ranging representation of a game in game theory

In game theory, an extensive-form game is a specification of a game allowing for the explicit representation of a number of key aspects, like the sequencing of players' possible moves, their choices at every decision point, the (possibly imperfect) information each player has about the other player's moves when they make a decision, and their payoffs for all possible game outcomes. Extensive-form games also allow for the representation of incomplete information in the form of chance events modeled as "moves by nature". Extensive-form representations differ from normal-form in that they provide a more complete description of the game in question, whereas normal-form simply boils down the game into a payoff matrix.

== Finite extensive-form games ==
Some authors, particularly in introductory textbooks, initially define the extensive-form game as being just a game tree with payoffs (no imperfect or incomplete information), and add the other elements in subsequent chapters as refinements. Whereas the rest of this article follows this gentle approach with motivating examples, we present upfront the finite extensive-form games as (ultimately) constructed here. This general definition was introduced by Harold W. Kuhn in 1953, who extended an earlier definition of von Neumann from 1928. Following the presentation from Hart (1992), an n-player extensive-form game thus consists of the following:

- A finite set of n (rational) players
- A rooted tree, called the game tree
- Each terminal (leaf) node of the game tree has an n-tuple of payoffs, meaning there is one payoff for each player at the end of every possible play
- A partition of the non-terminal nodes of the game tree in n+1 subsets, one for each (rational) player, and with a special subset for a fictitious player called Chance (or Nature). Each player's subset of nodes is referred to as the "nodes of the player". (A game of complete information thus has an empty set of Chance nodes.)
- Each node of the Chance player has a probability distribution over its outgoing edges.
- Each set of nodes of a rational player is further partitioned in information sets, which make certain choices indistinguishable for the player when making a move, in the sense that:
  - there is a one-to-one correspondence between outgoing edges of any two nodes of the same information set—thus the set of all outgoing edges of an information set is partitioned in equivalence classes, each class representing a possible choice for a player's move at some point—, and
  - every (directed) path in the tree from the root to a terminal node can cross each information set at most once
- the complete description of the game specified by the above parameters is common knowledge among the players

A play is thus a path through the tree from the root to a terminal node. At any given non-terminal node belonging to Chance, an outgoing branch is chosen according to the probability distribution. At any rational player's node, the player must choose one of the equivalence classes for the edges, which determines precisely one outgoing edge except (in general) the player doesn't know which one is being followed. (An outside observer knowing every other player's choices up to that point, and the realization of Nature's moves, can determine the edge precisely.) A pure strategy for a player thus consists of a selection—choosing precisely one class of outgoing edges for every information set (of his). In a game of perfect information, the information sets are singletons. It's less evident how payoffs should be interpreted in games with Chance nodes. It is assumed that each player has a von Neumann–Morgenstern utility function defined for every game outcome; this assumption entails that every rational player will evaluate an a priori random outcome by its expected utility.

The above presentation, while precisely defining the mathematical structure over which the game is played, elides however the more technical discussion of formalizing statements about how the game is played like "a player cannot distinguish between nodes in the same information set when making a decision". These can be made precise using epistemic modal logic; see Shoham & Leyton-Brown (2009, chpt. 13) for details.

A perfect information two-player game over a game tree (as defined in combinatorial game theory and artificial intelligence) can be represented as an extensive form game with outcomes (i.e. win, lose, or draw). Examples of such games include tic-tac-toe, chess, and infinite chess. A game over an expectminimax tree, like that of backgammon, has no imperfect information (all information sets are singletons) but has moves of chance. For example, poker has both moves of chance (the cards being dealt) and imperfect information (the cards secretly held by other players). (Binmore 2007, chpt. 2)

=== Perfect and complete information ===
A complete extensive-form representation specifies:

1. the players of a game
2. for every player every opportunity they have to move
3. what each player can do at each of their moves
4. what each player knows for every move
5. the payoffs received by every player for every possible combination of moves

A game represented in extensive form

The game on the right has two players: 1 and 2. The numbers by every non-terminal node indicate to which player that decision node belongs. The numbers by every terminal node represent the payoffs to the players (e.g. 2,1 represents a payoff of 2 to player 1 and a payoff of 1 to player 2). The labels by every edge of the graph are the name of the action that edge represents.

The initial node belongs to player 1, indicating that player 1 moves first. Play according to the tree is as follows: player 1 chooses between U and D; player 2 observes player 1's choice and then chooses between U' and D' . The payoffs are as specified in the tree. There are four outcomes represented by the four terminal nodes of the tree: (U,U'), (U,D'), (D,U') and (D,D'). The payoffs associated with each outcome respectively are as follows (0,0), (2,1), (1,2) and (3,1).

If player 1 plays D, player 2 will play U' to maximise their payoff and so player 1 will only receive 1. However, if player 1 plays U, player 2 maximises their payoff by playing D' and player 1 receives 2. Player 1 prefers 2 to 1 and so will play U and player 2 will play D' . This is the subgame perfect equilibrium.

=== Imperfect information ===
An advantage of representing the game in this way is that it is clear what the order of play is. The tree shows clearly that player 1 moves first and player 2 observes this move. However, in some games play does not occur like this. One player does not always observe the choice of another (for example, moves may be simultaneous or a move may be hidden). An information set is a set of decision nodes such that:

1. Every node in the set belongs to one player.
2. When the game reaches the information set, the player who is about to move cannot differentiate between nodes within the information set; i.e. if the information set contains more than one node, the player to whom that set belongs does not know which node in the set has been reached.

In extensive form, an information set is indicated by a dotted line connecting all nodes in that set or sometimes by a loop drawn around all the nodes in that set.

A game with imperfect information represented in extensive form

If a game has an information set with more than one member that game is said to have imperfect information. A game with perfect information is such that at any stage of the game, every player knows exactly what has taken place earlier in the game; i.e. every information set is a singleton set. Any game without perfect information has imperfect information.

The game on the right is the same as the above game except that player 2 does not know what player 1 does when they come to play. The first game described has perfect information; the game on the right does not. If both players are rational and both know that both players are rational and everything that is known by any player is known to be known by every player (i.e. player 1 knows player 2 knows that player 1 is rational and player 2 knows this, etc. ad infinitum), play in the first game will be as follows: player 1 knows that if they play U, player 2 will play D' (because for player 2 a payoff of 1 is preferable to a payoff of 0) and so player 1 will receive 2. However, if player 1 plays D, player 2 will play U' (because to player 2 a payoff of 2 is better than a payoff of 1) and player 1 will receive 1. Hence, in the first game, the equilibrium will be (U, D' ) because player 1 prefers to receive 2 to 1 and so will play U and so player 2 will play D' .

In the second game it is less clear: player 2 cannot observe player 1's move. Player 1 would like to fool player 2 into thinking they have played U when they have actually played D so that player 2 will play D' and player 1 will receive 3. In fact in the second game there is a perfect Bayesian equilibrium where player 1 plays D and player 2 plays U' and player 2 holds the belief that player 1 will definitely play D. In this equilibrium, every strategy is rational given the beliefs held and every belief is consistent with the strategies played. Notice how the imperfection of information changes the outcome of the game.

To more easily solve this game for the Nash equilibrium, it can be converted to the normal form. Given this is a simultaneous/sequential game, player one and player two each have two strategies.

- Player 1's Strategies: {U , D}
- Player 2's Strategies: {U’ , D’}

Player 2 Player 1	Up' (U')	Down' (D')
Up (U)	(0,0)	(2,1)
Down (D)	(1,2)	(3,1)

We will have a two by two matrix with a unique payoff for each combination of moves. Using the normal form game, it is now possible to solve the game and identify dominant strategies for both players.

- If player 1 plays Up (U), player 2 prefers to play Down (D’) (Payoff 1>0)
- If player 1 plays Down (D), player 2 prefers to play Up (U’) (Payoff 2>1)
- If player 2 plays Up (U’), player 1 prefers to play Down (D) (Payoff 1>0)
- If player 2 plays Down (D’), player 1 prefers to play Down (D) (3>2)

These preferences can be marked within the matrix, and any box where both players have a preference provides a nash equilibrium. This particular game has a single solution of (D,U’) with a payoff of (1,2).

In games with infinite action spaces and imperfect information, non-singleton information sets are represented, if necessary, by inserting a dotted line connecting the (non-nodal) endpoints behind the arc described above or by dashing the arc itself. In the Stackelberg competition described above, if the second player had not observed the first player's move the game would no longer fit the Stackelberg model; it would be Cournot competition.

=== Incomplete information ===
It may be the case that a player does not know exactly what the payoffs of the game are or of what type their opponents are. This sort of game has incomplete information. In extensive form it is represented as a game with complete but imperfect information using the so-called Harsanyi transformation. This transformation introduces to the game the notion of nature's choice or God's choice. Consider a game consisting of an employer considering whether to hire a job applicant. The job applicant's ability might be one of two things: high or low. Their ability level is random; they either have low ability with probability 1/3 or high ability with probability 2/3. In this case, it is convenient to model nature as another player of sorts who chooses the applicant's ability according to those probabilities. Nature however does not have any payoffs. Nature's choice is represented in the game tree by a non-filled node. Edges coming from a nature's choice node are labelled with the probability of the event it represents occurring.

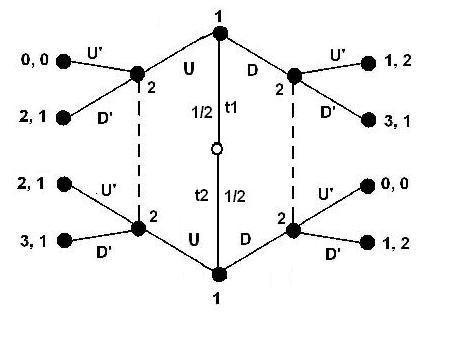
A game with incomplete and imperfect information represented in extensive form

The game on the left is one of complete information (all the players and payoffs are known to everyone) but of imperfect information (the employer doesn't know what nature's move was.) The initial node is in the centre and it is not filled, so nature moves first. Nature selects with the same probability the type of player 1 (which in this game is tantamount to selecting the payoffs in the subgame played), either t1 or t2. Player 1 has distinct information sets for these; i.e. player 1 knows what type they are (this need not be the case). However, player 2 does not observe nature's choice. They do not know the type of player 1; however, in this game they do observe player 1's actions; i.e. there is perfect information. Indeed, it is now appropriate to alter the above definition of complete information: at every stage in the game, every player knows what has been played by the other players. In the case of private information, every player knows what has been played by nature. Information sets are represented as before by broken lines.

In this game, if nature selects t1 as player 1's type, the game played will be like the very first game described, except that player 2 does not know it (and the very fact that this cuts through their information sets disqualify it from subgame status). There is one separating perfect Bayesian equilibrium; i.e. an equilibrium in which different types do different things.

If both types play the same action (pooling), an equilibrium cannot be sustained. If both play D, player 2 can only form the belief that they are on either node in the information set with probability 1/2 (because this is the chance of seeing either type). Player 2 maximises their payoff by playing D' . However, if they play D' , type 2 would prefer to play U. This cannot be an equilibrium. If both types play U, player 2 again forms the belief that they are at either node with probability 1/2. In this case player 2 plays D' , but then type 1 prefers to play D.

If type 1 plays U and type 2 plays D, player 2 will play D' whatever action they observe, but then type 1 prefers D. The only equilibrium hence is with type 1 playing D, type 2 playing U and player 2 playing U' if they observe D and randomising if they observe U. Through their actions, player 1 has signalled their type to player 2.

=== Formal definition ===
Formally, a finite game in extensive form is a structure $\Gamma = \langle\mathcal{K}, \mathbf{H}, [ (\mathbf{H}_i)_{i \in \mathcal{I} } ], \{ A(H) \}_{H \in \mathbf{H} }, a , \rho, u \rangle$ where:

- $\mathcal{K} = \langle V, v^0, T, p\rangle$ is a finite tree with a set of nodes $V$, a unique initial node $v^0 \in V$, a set of terminal nodes $T \subset V$ (let $D = V \setminus T$ be a set of decision nodes) and an immediate predecessor function $p: V \rightarrow D$ on which the rules of the game are represented,
- $\mathbf{H}$ is a partition of $D$ called an information partition,
- $A(H)$ is a set of actions available for each information set $H \in \mathbf{H}$ which forms a partition on the set of all actions $\mathcal{A}$.
- $a: V \setminus \{ v^0 \} \rightarrow \mathcal{A}$ is an action partition associating each node $v$ to a single action $a(v)$, fulfilling:

$\forall H \in \mathbf{H}, \forall v \in H$, the restriction $a_v: s(v) \rightarrow A(H)$ of $a$ on $s(v)$ is a bijection, with $s(v)$ the set of successor nodes of $v$.

- $\mathcal{I} = \{ 1, ..., I \}$ is a finite set of players, $0$ is (a special player called) nature, and $(\mathbf{H}_i)_{i \in \mathcal{I} \cup \{ 0 \} }$ is a player partition of information set $\mathbf{H}$. Let $\iota(v) = \iota(H)$ be a single player that makes a move at node $v \in H$.
- $\rho = \{ \rho_H: A(H) \rightarrow [0, 1] | H \in \mathbf{H}_0 \}$ is a family of probabilities of the actions of nature, and
- $u = (u_i)_{i \in \mathcal{I}}: T \rightarrow \mathbb{R}^\mathcal{I}$ is a payoff profile function.

== Infinite action space ==
It may be that a player has an infinite number of possible actions to choose from at a particular decision node. The device used to represent this is an arc joining two edges protruding from the decision node in question. If the action space is a continuum between two numbers, the lower and upper delimiting numbers are placed at the bottom and top of the arc respectively, usually with a variable that is used to express the payoffs. The infinite number of decision nodes that could result are represented by a single node placed in the centre of the arc. A similar device is used to represent action spaces that, whilst not infinite, are large enough to prove impractical to represent with an edge for each action.

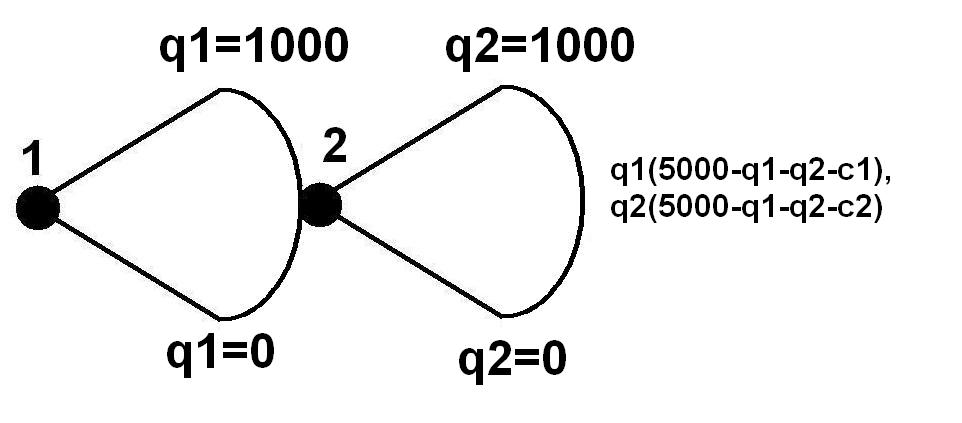
A game with infinite action spaces represented in extensive form

The tree on the left represents such a game, either with infinite action spaces (any real number between 0 and 5000) or with very large action spaces (perhaps any integer between 0 and 5000). This would be specified elsewhere. Here, it will be supposed that it is the former and, for concreteness, it will be supposed it represents two firms engaged in Stackelberg competition. The payoffs to the firms are represented on the left, with $q_1$ and $q_2$ as the strategy they adopt and $c_1$ and $c_2$ as some constants (here marginal costs to each firm). The subgame perfect Nash equilibria of this game can be found by taking the first partial derivative of each payoff function with respect to the follower's (firm 2) strategy variable ($q_2$) and finding its best response function, $q_2(q_1)=\tfrac{5000-q_1-c_2}2$. The same process can be done for the leader except that in calculating its profit, it knows that firm 2 will play the above response and so this can be substituted into its maximisation problem. It can then solve for $q_1$ by taking the first derivative, yielding $q_1^*=\tfrac{5000+c_2-2c_1}2$. Feeding this into firm 2's best response function, $q_2^*=\tfrac{5000+2c_1-3c_2}4$ and $(q_1^*,q_2^*)$ is the subgame perfect Nash equilibrium.

== See also ==
- Axiom of determinacy
- Perfect information
- Combinatorial game theory
- Self-confirming equilibrium
- Sequential game
- Signalling
- Solution concept
