= Manipulated Nash equilibrium =

MAPNASH
- Solution concept in game theory

Relationship
- Subset of: Nash equilibrium, Subgame perfect equilibrium

Significance
- Proposed by: A. Amershi, A. Sadanand, and V. Sadanand
- Used for: Dynamic games of imperfect information
- Example: Battle of the sexes

In game theory, a Manipulated Nash equilibrium or MAPNASH is a refinement of subgame perfect equilibrium used in dynamic games of imperfect information. Informally, a strategy set is a MAPNASH of a game if it would be a subgame perfect equilibrium of the game if the game had perfect information. MAPNASH were first suggested by Amershi, Sadanand, and Sadanand (1988) and has been discussed in several papers since. It is a solution concept based on how players think about other players' thought processes.

== Formal definition and an example ==
Consider a dynamic game of imperfect information, G. Based on G, construct a game, PG, which has the same strategies, payoffs, and order of moves as G except PG is a game of perfect information (every player in PG is aware of the strategies chosen by those players who moved before). A strategy, S, in G is a MAPNASH of G if and only if S is a Nash equilibrium of G and S is a subgame perfect equilibrium of PG.

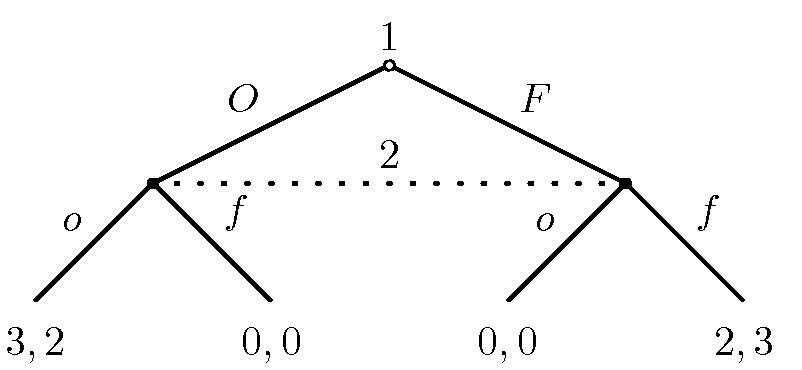
Battle of the Sexes with imperfect information (G)

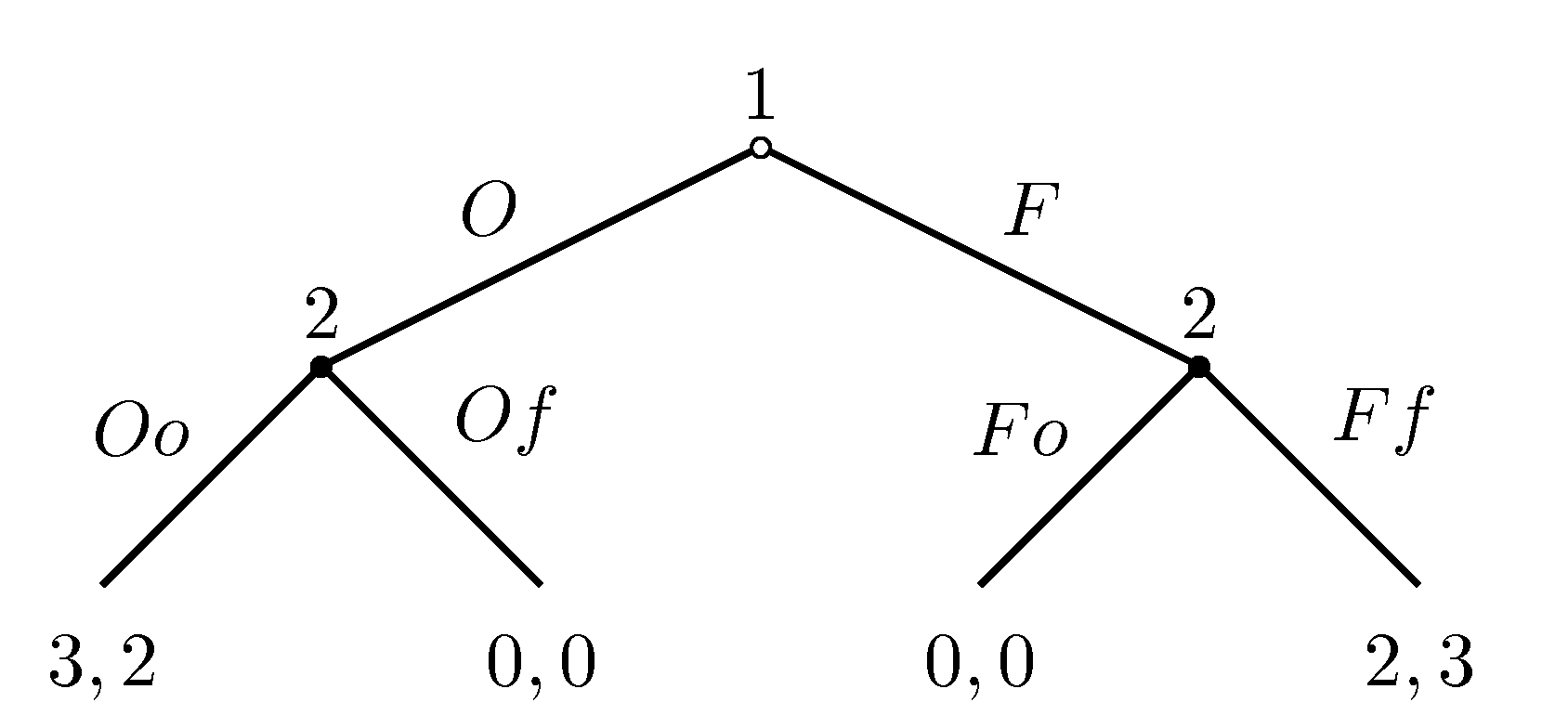
Battle of the Sexes with perfect information (PG)

As an example, consider a sequential version of Battle of the sexes (pictured above on the left). This game has three Nash equilibrium: (O, o), (F, f), and one mixed equilibrium. We can construct a perfect information version (pictured above on the right). This game has only one subgame perfect equilibrium (O, Oo) If the first player chooses O, the second will choose Oo because 2 is better than 0. If the first player chooses F, the second will choose Ff because 3 is better than 0. So, player 1 is choosing between 3 if she chooses O and 2 if she chooses F. As a result, player 1 will choose O and player 2 will choose Oo.

In the imperfect information Battle of the sexes (G) the only MAPNASH is (O, o). Effectively, by moving first, player 1 can force the other player to choose her preferred equilibrium, hence the name "manipulated."

== Significance ==
In traditional game theory the order of moves was only relevant if there was asymmetric information. In the case of battle of the sexes discussed above, the imperfect information game is equivalent to a game where player 2 moves first and a game where both players move simultaneously. If players follow MAPNASH, the order of moves is relevant even if it does not introduce asymmetries in information. Experimental evidence seems to suggest that actual players are influenced by the order of moves even if the order does not provide players with additional information.

Cooper et al. (1993) study a version of battle of the sexes and find that when one player moves before the other, the first player tends to choose his favorite equilibrium more often and the second player chooses her less favored equilibrium more often. This is a reversal for the second player compared to the same game where both players chooses simultaneously. Similar results are observed in public good games by Budescu, Au, and Chen (1997) and Rapoport (1997).

All of these games are coordination games where equilibrium selection is an important problem. In these games one player has a preferred equilibrium, and one might suppose that the order of moves introduces an asymmetry that solves the coordination problem. In order to resolve this problem Weber, Camerer, and Knez (2004) study a coordination game where no player prefers one equilibrium over another. They find that in this game introducing order results in different equilibria being selected, and they conclude that MAPNASH may be an important predictive tool.
