= Coalition-proof Nash equilibrium =

- Solution concept in game theory

Relationship
- Subset of: Nash Equilibrium
- Superset of: Strong Nash equilibrium

Significance

The concept of coalition-proof Nash equilibrium applies to certain "noncooperative" environments in which players can freely discuss their strategies but cannot make binding commitments. It emphasizes the immunization to deviations that are self-enforcing. While the best-response property in Nash equilibrium is necessary for self-enforceability, it is not generally sufficient when players can jointly deviate in a way that is mutually beneficial.

The Strong Nash equilibrium is criticized as too "strong" in that the environment allows for unlimited private communication. In the coalition-proof Nash equilibrium the private communication is limited.

== Definition ==
Informally: At first all players are in a room deliberating their strategies. Then one by one, they leave the room fixing their strategy and only those left are allowed to change their strategies, both individually and together.

Formal definition:

1. In a single player, single stage game $\Gamma$, $s^{\ast} \in S$ is a Perfectly Coalition-Proof Nash equilibrium if and only if $s^{\ast}$ maximizes $g^1(s)$.
2. Let $(n,t) \ne (1,1)$. Assume that a Perfectly Coalition-Proof Nash equilibrium has been defined for all games with $m$ players and $s$ stages, where $(m, s) \le (n, t)$, and $(m, s) \ne (n, t)$.
  1. For any game $\Gamma$ with $n$ players and $t$ stages, $s^* \in S$ is perfectly self-enforcing if, for all $J$ in $\mathbf{J}$ (set of all coalitions), $s_J^{*}$ is a Perfectly Coalition-Proof Nash equilibrium in the game $\Gamma/s_{-J}^{*}$, and if the restriction of $s^{*}$ to any proper subgame forms a Perfectly Coalition-Proof Nash equilibrium in that subgame.
  2. For any game $\Gamma$ with $n$ players and $t$ stages, $s^* \in S$ is a Perfectly Coalition-Proof Nash equilibrium if it is perfectly self-enforcing, and if there does not exist another perfectly self-enforcing strategy vector $s$ in $S$ such that $g^1(s)> g^1(s^{*})$ for all $i= 1,\dots,n$.

The coalition-proof Nash equilibrium refines the Nash equilibrium by adopting a stronger notion of self-enforceability that allows multilateral deviations.

Parallel to the idea of correlated equilibrium as an extension to Nash equilibrium when public signalling device is allowed, coalition-proof equilibrium is defined by Diego Moreno and John Wooders.
