= Markov perfect equilibrium =

Concept in game theory

- Solution concept in game theory

Relationship
- Subset of: Subgame perfect equilibrium

Significance
- Proposed by: Eric Maskin, Jean Tirole
- Used for: tacit collusion; price wars; oligopolistic competition

A Markov perfect equilibrium is an equilibrium concept in game theory. It has been used in analyses of industrial organization, macroeconomics, and political economy. It is a refinement of the concept of subgame perfect equilibrium to extensive form games for which a pay-off relevant state space can be identified. The term appeared in publications starting about 1988 in the work of economists Jean Tirole and Eric Maskin.

== Definition ==
In extensive form games, and specifically in stochastic games, a Markov perfect equilibrium is a set of mixed strategies for each of the players which satisfy the following criteria:

- The strategies have the Markov property of memorylessness, meaning that each player's mixed strategy can be conditioned only on the state of the game. These strategies are called Markov reaction functions.
- The state can only encode payoff-relevant information. This rules out strategies that depend on non-substantive moves by the opponent. It excludes strategies that depend on signals, negotiation, or cooperation between the players (e.g. cheap talk or contracts).
- The strategies form a subgame perfect equilibrium of the game.

== Focus on symmetric equilibria ==
In symmetric games, when the players have a strategy and action sets which are mirror images of one another, often the analysis focuses on symmetric equilibria, where all players play the same mixed strategy. As in the rest of game theory, this is done both because these are easier to find analytically and because they are perceived to be stronger focal points than asymmetric equilibria.

== Lack of robustness ==
Markov perfect equilibria are not stable with respect to small changes in the game itself. A small change in payoffs can cause a large change in the set of Markov perfect equilibria. This is because a state with a tiny effect on payoffs can be used to carry signals, but if its payoff difference from any other state drops to zero, it must be merged with it, eliminating the possibility of using it to carry signals.

== Examples ==
For examples of this equilibrium concept, consider the competition between firms which have invested heavily into fixed costs and are dominant producers in an industry, forming an oligopoly. The players are taken to be committed to levels of production capacity in the short run, and the strategies describe their decisions in setting prices. The firms' objectives are modelled as maximizing the present discounted value of profits.

=== Airfare game ===
Often an airplane ticket for a certain route has the same price on either airline A or airline B. Presumably, the two airlines do not have exactly the same costs, nor do they face the same demand function given their varying frequent-flyer programs, the different connections their passengers will make, and so forth. Thus, a realistic general equilibrium model would be unlikely to result in nearly identical prices.

Both airlines have made sunk investments into the equipment, personnel, and legal framework, thus committing to offering service. They are engaged or trapped, in a strategic game with one another when setting prices.

Consider the following strategy of an airline for setting the ticket price for a certain route. At every price-setting opportunity:

- if the other airline is charging $300 or more, or is not selling tickets on that flight, charge $300
- if the other airline is charging between $200 and $300, charge the same price
- if the other airline is charging $200 or less, choose randomly between the following three options with equal probability: matching that price, charging $300, or exiting the game by ceasing indefinitely to offer service on this route.

This is a Markov strategy because it does not depend on a history of past observations. It satisfies also the Markov reaction function definition because it does not depend on other information which is irrelevant to revenues and profits.

Assume now that both airlines follow this strategy exactly. Assume further that passengers always choose the cheapest flight and so if the airlines charge different prices, the one charging the higher price gets zero passengers. Then if each airline assumes that the other airline will follow this strategy, there is no higher-payoff alternative strategy for itself, i.e. it is playing a best response to the other airline strategy. If both airlines followed this strategy, it would form a Nash equilibrium in every proper subgame, thus a subgame-perfect Nash equilibrium. (Note: This kind of extreme simplification is necessary to get through the example but could be relaxed in a more thorough study. A more complete specification of the game, including payoffs, would be necessary to show that these strategies can form a subgame-perfect Nash equilibrium. For illustration let us suppose however that the strategies do form such an equilibrium and therefore that they also constitute a Markov perfect equilibrium.)

A Markov-perfect equilibrium concept has also been used to model aircraft production, as different companies evaluate their future profits and how much they will learn from production experience in light of demand and what others firms might supply.

=== Discussion ===
Airlines do not literally or exactly follow these strategies, but the model helps explain the observation that airlines often charge exactly the same price, even though a general equilibrium model specifying non-perfect substitutability would generally not provide such a result. The Markov perfect equilibrium model helps shed light on tacit collusion in an oligopoly setting, and make predictions for cases not observed.

One strength of an explicit game-theoretical framework is that it allows us to make predictions about the behaviours of the airlines if and when the equal-price outcome breaks down, and interpret and examine these price wars in light of different equilibrium concepts. In contrast to another equilibrium concept, Maskin and Tirole identify an empirical attribute of such price wars: in a Markov strategy price war, "a firm cuts its price not to punish its competitor, [rather only to] regain market share" whereas in a general repeated game framework a price cut may be a punishment to the other player. The authors claim that the market share justification is closer to the empirical account than the punishment justification, and so the Markov perfect equilibrium concept proves more informative, in this case.

== Bibliography ==
- Fudenberg, Drew; Tirole, Jean (1991). Game Theory. Cambridge, Massachusetts: MIT Press. pp. 501–502. ISBN 9780262061414. Book preview.
- Tirole, Jean. 1988. The Theory of Industrial Organization. Cambridge, MA: The MIT Press.
- Maskin, Eric, and Jean Tirole. 1988. "A Theory of Dynamic Oligopoly: I & II" Econometrica 56:3, 549-600.
