= Satisfaction equilibrium =

Solution Concept for Noncooperative games

Satisfaction Equilibrium
- Solution concept in game theory

Relationship
- Subset of: solution concept
- Superset of: Non-cooperative game theory

Significance
- Used for: All non-cooperative games

In game theory, a satisfaction equilibrium is a solution concept for a class of non-cooperative games, namely games in satisfaction form. Games in satisfaction form model situations in which players aim at satisfying a given individual constraint, e.g., a performance metric must be smaller or bigger than a given threshold. When a player satisfies its own constraint, the player is said to be satisfied. A satisfaction equilibrium, if it exists, arises when all players in the game are satisfied.

== History ==
The term Satisfaction equilibrium (SE) was first used to refer to the stable point of a dynamic interaction between players that are learning an equilibrium by taking actions and observing their own payoffs. The equilibrium lies on the satisfaction principle, which stipulates that an agent that is satisfied with its current payoff does not change its current action.

Later, the notion of satisfaction equilibrium was introduced as a solution concept for Games in satisfaction form. Such solution concept was introduced in the realm of electrical engineering for the analysis of quality of service (QoS) in Wireless ad hoc networks. In this context, radio devices (network components) are modelled as players that decide upon their own operating configurations in order to satisfy some targeted QoS.

Games in satisfaction form and the notion of satisfaction equilibrium have been used in the context of the fifth generation of cellular communications (5G) for tackling the problem of energy efficiency, spectrum sharing and transmit power control. In the smart grid, games in satisfaction form have been used for modelling the problem of data injection attacks.

== Games in Satisfaction Form ==
In static games of complete, perfect information, a satisfaction-form representation of a game is a specification of the set of players, the players' action sets and their preferences. The preferences for a given player are determined by a mapping, often referred to as the preference mapping, from the Cartesian product of all the other players' action sets to the given player's power set of actions. That is, given the actions adopted by all the other players, the preference mapping determines the subset of actions with which the player is satisfied.

Definition [Games in Satisfaction Form]
A game in satisfaction form is described by a tuple

$$\left( \mathcal{K}, \left\lbrace \mathcal{A}_k \right\rbrace_{k \in \mathcal{K}},\left\lbrace f_{k}\right\rbrace_{ k \in\mathcal{K}} \right),$$

where, the set $\mathcal{K} = \lbrace 1, \ldots, K \rbrace \subset \mathrm{N}$, with $0 < K < +\infty$, represents the set of players; the set $\mathcal{A}_{k}$, with $k \in \mathcal{K}$ and $0< |\mathcal{A}_k | < +\infty$, represents the set of actions that player $k$ can play. The preference mapping

$$f_k: \mathcal{A}_1 \times \ldots \times \mathcal{A}_{k-1} \times \mathcal{A}_{k+1} \times \ldots, \times\mathcal{A}_K  \rightarrow 2^{\mathcal{A}_k}$$

determines the set of actions with which player $k$ is satisfied given the actions played by all the other players. The set $2^{\mathcal{A}_k}$ is the power set of $\mathcal{A}_k$.

In contrast to other existing game formulations, e.g., normal form and normal form with constrained action sets, the notion of performance optimization, i.e., utility maximization or cost minimization, is not present. Games in satisfaction-form model the case in which players adopt their actions aiming to satisfy a specific individual constraint given the actions adopted by all the other players. An important remark is that, players are assumed to be careless of whether other players can satisfy or not their individual constraints.

=== Satisfaction Equilibrium ===
An action profile is a tuple $\boldsymbol{a} = \left(a_{1}, \ldots, a_{K} \right) \in \mathcal{A}_1 \times \ldots \times \mathcal{A}_K$. The action profile in which all players are satisfied is an equilibrium of the corresponding game in satisfaction form. At a satisfaction equilibrium, players do not exhibit a particular interest in changing its current action.

Definition [Satisfaction Equilibrium in Pure Strategies]
The action profile $\boldsymbol{a}$ is a satisfaction equilibrium in pure strategies for the game $\left( \mathcal{K}, \left\lbrace \mathcal{A}_k \right\rbrace_{k \in \mathcal{K}},\left\lbrace f_{k}\right\rbrace_{ k \in\mathcal{K}} \right),$ if for all $k \in \mathcal{K}$,

$a_k \in f_{k}\left(a_1, \ldots, a_{k-1},a_{k+1},\ldots, a_K\right)$.

=== Satisfaction Equilibrium in Mixed Strategies ===
For all $k \in \mathcal{K}$, denote the set of all possible probability distributions over the set $\mathcal{A}_k = \lbrace A_{k,1},A_{k,2}, \ldots, A_{k,N_k} \rbrace$ by $\triangle\left( \mathcal{A}_k \right)$, with $N_k = |\mathcal{A}_k|$. Denote by $\boldsymbol{\pi}_k = \left(\pi_{k,1}, \pi_{k,2},\ldots, \pi_{k,N_k} \right)$ the probability distribution (mixed strategy) adopted by player $k$ to choose its actions. For all $j \in \lbrace 1, \ldots, N_k\rbrace$, $\pi_{k,j}$ represents the probability with which player $k$ chooses action $A_{k,j} \in \mathcal{A}_k$. The notation $\boldsymbol{\pi}_{-k}$ represents the mixed strategies of all players except that of player $k$.

Definition [Extension to Mixed Strategies of the Satisfaction Form ] The extension in mixed strategies of the game $\left( \mathcal{K}, \left\lbrace \mathcal{A}_k \right\rbrace_{k \in \mathcal{K}},\left\lbrace f_{k}\right\rbrace_{ k \in\mathcal{K}} \right)$ is described by the tuple $\left( \mathcal{K}, \left\lbrace \mathcal{A}_k \right\rbrace_{k \in \mathcal{K}},\left\lbrace \bar{f}_{k}\right\rbrace_{ k \in\mathcal{K}} \right)$, where the correspondence

$$\bar{f}_k: \prod_{j\in\mathcal{K}\setminus\lbrace k \rbrace} \triangle\left(\mathcal{A}_j\right) \rightarrow 2^{\triangle\left(\mathcal{A}_{k}\right)}$$

determines the set of all possible probability distributions that allow player $k$ to choose an action that satisfies its individual conditions with probability one, that is,

$\bar{f}_k\left( \boldsymbol{\pi}_{-k} \right) = \left\lbrace \boldsymbol{\pi}_k \in \triangle\left( \mathcal{A}_k \right): \mathrm{Pr}\left(a_k \in f_k\left( \boldsymbol{a}_{-k} \right)| a_k \sim \boldsymbol{\pi}_k, \boldsymbol{a}_{-k} \sim \boldsymbol{\pi}_{-k}\right) = 1\right\rbrace.$

A satisfaction equilibrium in mixed strategies is defined as follows.

Definition [Satisfaction Equilibrium in Mixed Strategies]
The mixed strategy profile $\boldsymbol{\pi}^* \in \triangle\left(\mathcal{A}_1\right)\times\ldots\times\triangle\left(\mathcal{A}_K\right)$ is an SE in mixed strategies if for all $k \in \mathcal{K}$,

$\boldsymbol{\pi}_k^* \in \bar{f}_k\left( \boldsymbol{\pi}_{-k}^*\right)$.

Let the $j$-th action of player $k$, i.e., $A_{k,j}$, be associated with the unitary vector $\boldsymbol{e}_{j} = \left(e_{1},e_{2} \ldots, e_{N_k} \right) \in \mathrm{R}^{N_k}$, where, all the components are zero except its $j$-th component, which is equal to one. The vector $\boldsymbol{e}_{j}$ represents a degenerated probability distribution, where the action $A_{k,j}$ is deterministically chosen. Using this argument, it becomes clear that every satisfaction equilibrium in pure strategies of the game $\left( \mathcal{K}, \left\lbrace \mathcal{A}_k \right\rbrace_{k \in \mathcal{K}},\left\lbrace f_{k}\right\rbrace_{ k \in\mathcal{K}} \right)$ is also a satisfaction equilibrium in mixed strategies of the game $\left( \mathcal{K}, \left\lbrace \mathcal{A}_k \right\rbrace_{k \in \mathcal{K}},\left\lbrace \bar{f}_{k}\right\rbrace_{ k \in\mathcal{K}} \right)$.

At an SE of the game $\left( \mathcal{K}, \left\lbrace \mathcal{A}_k \right\rbrace_{k \in \mathcal{K}},\left\lbrace f_{k}\right\rbrace_{ k \in\mathcal{K}} \right)$, players choose their actions following a probability distribution such that only action profiles that allow all players to simultaneously satisfy their individual conditions with probability one are played with positive probability. Hence, in the case in which one SE in pure strategies does not exist, then, it does not exist a SE in mixed strategies in the game $\left( \mathcal{K}, \left\lbrace \mathcal{A}_k \right\rbrace_{k \in \mathcal{K}},\left\lbrace \bar{f}_{k}\right\rbrace_{ k \in\mathcal{K}} \right)$.

=== ε-Satisfaction Equilibrium ===
Under certain conditions, it is always possible to build mixed strategies that allow players to be satisfied with probability $1-\epsilon$, for some $\epsilon > 0$. This observation leads to the definition of a solution concept known as $\epsilon$-satisfaction equilibrium ($\epsilon$-SE).

Definition: [ε-Satisfaction Equilibrium]
Let $\epsilon$ satisfy $\epsilon \in \left] 0, 1\right]$. The mixed strategy profile $\boldsymbol{\pi}^* \in \triangle\left(\mathcal{A}_1\right)\times\triangle\left(\mathcal{A}_2\right)\times \ldots\times\triangle\left(\mathcal{A}_K\right)$ is an epsilon-satisfaction equilibrium ($\epsilon$-SE) of the game $\left( \mathcal{K}, \left\lbrace \mathcal{A}_k \right\rbrace_{k \in \mathcal{K}},\left\lbrace \bar{f}_{k}\right\rbrace_{ k \in\mathcal{K}} \right)$, if for all $k \in \mathcal{K}$, it follows that

$$\boldsymbol{\pi}_{k}^* \in \bar{\bar{f}}_k\left( \boldsymbol{\pi}_{-k}^* \right)$$,

where

$\bar{\bar{f}}_k\left( \boldsymbol{\pi}_{-k}^* \right) = \left\lbrace \boldsymbol{\pi}_k \in \triangle\left( \mathcal{A}_k \right): \mathrm{Pr}\left( a_k \in f_k\left( \boldsymbol{a}_{-k} \right) | a_k \sim \boldsymbol{\pi}_k, \boldsymbol{a}_{-k} \sim \boldsymbol{\pi}_{-k}^* \right) \geqslant 1-\epsilon \right\rbrace.$

From the definition above, it can be implied that if the mixed strategy profile $\boldsymbol{\pi}^*$ is an $\epsilon$-SE, it holds that,

$$\mathrm{Pr} \left( a_k \in f_k\left( \boldsymbol{a}_{-k} \right) |  a_k \sim \boldsymbol{\pi}_k^*, \boldsymbol{a}_{-k} \sim \boldsymbol{\pi}_{-k}^*\right) \geqslant 1 - \epsilon.$$

That is, players are unsatisfied with probability $\epsilon$. The relevance of the $\epsilon$-SE is that it models the fact that players can be tolerant a certain unsatisfaction level. At a given $\epsilon$-SE, none of the players is interested in changing its mixed strategy profile as long as it is satisfied with a probability higher than or equal to $1 - \epsilon$, for some $\epsilon > 0$.

In contrast to the conditions for the existence of a SE in either pure or mixed strategies, the conditions for the existence of an $\epsilon$-SE are mild.

Proposition [Existence of an $\epsilon$-SE]
Let $\left( \mathcal{K}, \left\lbrace \mathcal{A}_k \right\rbrace_{k \in \mathcal{K}},\left\lbrace f_{k}\right\rbrace_{ k \in\mathcal{K}} \right)$, be a finite game in satisfaction form. Then, if for all $k \in \mathcal{K}$, there always exists an action profile $\boldsymbol{a} \in \mathcal{A}$ such that

$$a_k \in f_k\left( \boldsymbol{a}_{-k} \right)$$,

then there always exists a strategy profile $\boldsymbol{\pi}^* \in \triangle\left(\mathcal{A}_1\right) \times \triangle\left(\mathcal{A}_2\right) \times \ldots \times \triangle\left(\mathcal{A}_K\right)$ and a real $\epsilon$, with $1 > \epsilon > 0$, such that, $\boldsymbol{\pi}^{\star}$ is an $\epsilon$-SE.

== Equilibrium Selection ==
Games in satisfaction form might exhibit several satisfaction equilibria. In such a case, players might associate to each of their own actions a value representing the effort or cost to play such action. From this perspective, if several SEs exist, players might prefer the one that requires the lowest (global or individual) effort or cost. To model this preference, games in satisfaction form might be equipped with cost functions for each of the players.

For all $k \in \mathcal{K}$, let the function $c_k : \mathcal{A}_k \rightarrow \left[ 0, 1 \right]$ determine the effort or cost paid by player $k$ for using each of its actions. More specifically, given a pair of actions $(a_k, a_k') \in \mathcal{A}_k^2$, the action $a_k$ is preferred against $a_k'$ by player $k$ if

$$c_k\left( a_k \right) < c_k\left( a_k' \right),$$

Note that this preference for player $k$ is independent of the actions adopted by all the other players.

Definition: [Efficient Satisfaction Equilibrium (ESE)]
Let $\mathcal{S}$ be the set of satisfaction equilibria in pure strategies of the game in satisfaction form $\left( \mathcal{K}, \left\lbrace \mathcal{A}_k \right\rbrace_{k \in \mathcal{K}},\left\lbrace f_{k}\right\rbrace_{ k \in\mathcal{K}} \right)$. The strategy profile $\boldsymbol{a}^{\star} = \left(a_1^{\star}, a_2^{\star}, \ldots, a_K^{\star} \right) \in \mathcal{A}$ is an efficient satisfaction equilibrium if for all $\boldsymbol{a} \in \mathcal{A}$, it follows that

$\sum_{k =1}^{K} c_{k}\left( a_k^{\star} \right) \leqslant \sum_{k =1}^{K} c_{k}\left( a_k \right)$.

In the trivial case in which for all $k \in \mathcal{K}$ the function $c_k$ is a constant function, the set of ESE and the set of SE are identical. This highlights the relevance of the ability of players to differentiate the effort of playing one action or another in order to select one (satisfaction) equilibrium among all the existing equilibria.

In games in satisfaction form with nonempty sets of satisfaction equilibria, when all players assign different costs to its actions, i.e., for all $k \in \mathcal{K}$ and for all $(a, a') \in \mathcal{A}_k \times \mathcal{A}_k$, it holds that $c_k(a) \neq c_k(a')$, there always exists an ESE. Nonetheless, it is not necessarily unique, which implies that there still exists room for other equilibrium refinements beyond the notion of individual cost functions.

== Generalizations ==
Games in satisfaction form for which it does not exists an action profile in which all players are satisfied are said not to possess a satisfaction equilibrium. In this case, an action profile induces a partition of the set $\mathcal{K}$ formed by the sets $\mathcal{K}_{\mathrm{s}}$ and $\mathcal{K}_{\mathrm{u}}$. On one hand, the players in $\mathcal{K}_{\mathrm{s}}$ are satisfied. On the other hand, players in $\mathcal{K}_{\mathrm{u}}$ are unsatisfied. If players in the set $\mathcal{K}_{\mathrm{u}}$ cannot be satisfied by any of its actions given the actions of all the other players, these players are not interested in changing its current action. This implies that action profiles that satisfy this condition are also equilibria. This is because none of the players is particularly interested in changing their current actions, even those that are unsatisfied. This reasoning led to another solution concept known as generalized satisfaction equilibrium (GSE). This generalization is proposed in the context of a novel game formulation, namely the generalized satisfaction form.

Definition: [Generalized Satisfaction Form]
A game in generalized satisfaction form is described by a tuple $\left( \mathcal{K}, \left\lbrace \mathcal{A}_k \right\rbrace_{k \in \mathcal{K}},\left\lbrace g_{k}\right\rbrace_{ k \in\mathcal{K}} \right)$, where, the set $\mathcal{K} = \lbrace 1, \ldots, K \rbrace \subset \mathrm{N}$, with $0 < K < +\infty$, represents the set of players; the set $\mathcal{A}_{k}$, with $k \in \mathcal{K}$ and $0< |\mathcal{A}_k | < +\infty$, represents the set of actions that player $k$ can play; and the preference mapping

$$g_k: \prod_{j\in\mathcal{K}\setminus\lbrace k \rbrace} \triangle\left(\mathcal{A}_j\right) \rightarrow 2^{\triangle\left(\mathcal{A}_{k}\right)}$$,

determines the set of probability mass functions (mixed strategies) with support $\mathcal{A}_k$ that satisfy player $k$ given the mixed strategies adopted by all the other players.

The generalized satisfaction equilibrium is defined as follows.

Definition: [Generalized Satisfaction Equilibrium (GSE)]
The mixed strategy profile $\boldsymbol{\pi}^* \in \triangle\left(\mathcal{A}_1\right)\times\ldots\times\triangle\left(\mathcal{A}_K\right)$ is a generalized satisfaction equilibrium of the game in generalized satisfaction form $\left( \mathcal{K}, \left\lbrace \mathcal{A}_k \right\rbrace_{k \in \mathcal{K}},\left\lbrace g_{k}\right\rbrace_{ k \in\mathcal{K}} \right)$ if there exists a partition of the set $\mathcal{K}$ formed by the sets $\mathcal{K}_{\mathrm{s}}$ and $\mathcal{K}_{\mathrm{u}}$ and the following holds:
(i) For all $k \in \mathcal{K}_{\mathrm{s}}$, $\boldsymbol{\pi}_k \in g_{k}\left( \boldsymbol{\pi}_{-k}\right)$; and
(ii)For all $k \in \mathcal{K}_{\mathrm{u}}$, $g_{k}\left( \boldsymbol{\pi}_{-k}\right) = \empty.$

Note that the GSE boils down to the notion of $\epsilon$-SE of the game in satisfaction form $\left( \mathcal{K}, \left\lbrace \mathcal{A}_k \right\rbrace_{k \in \mathcal{K}},\left\lbrace \bar{f}_{k}\right\rbrace_{ k \in\mathcal{K}} \right),$ when, $\mathcal{K}_{\mathrm{u}} = \emptyset$ and for all $k \in \mathcal{K}$, the correspondence $g_k$ is chosen to be

$$g(\boldsymbol{a}_{-k}) = \bar{\bar{f}}_k\left( \boldsymbol{\pi}_{-k}^* \right),$$

with $\epsilon > 0$. Similarly, the GSE boils down to the notion of SE in mixed strategies when $\epsilon = 0$ and $\mathcal{K}_{\mathrm{u}} = \emptyset$. Finally, note that any SE is a GSE, but the converse is not true.
