= M equilibrium =

Mathematical concept

M equilibrium is a set valued solution concept in game theory that relaxes the rational choice assumptions of perfect maximization ("no mistakes") and perfect beliefs ("no surprises"). The concept can be applied to any normal-form game with finite and discrete strategies. M equilibrium was first introduced by Jacob K. Goeree and Philippos Louis.

== Background ==
A large body of work in experimental game theory has documented systematic departures from Nash equilibrium, the cornerstone of classic game theory. The lack of empirical support for Nash equilibrium led Nash himself to return to doing research in pure mathematics. Selten, who shared the 1994 Nobel Prize with Nash, likewise concluded that "game theory is for proving theorems, not for playing games". M equilibrium is motivated by the desire for an empirically relevant game theory.

M equilibrium accomplishes this by replacing the two main assumptions underlying classical game theory, perfect maximization and rational expectations, with the weaker notions of ordinal monotonicity –players' choice probabilities are ranked the same as the expected payoffs based on their beliefs – and ordinal consistency – players' beliefs yield the same ranking of expected payoffs as their choices.

M equilibria do not follow from the fixed-points that follow by imposing rational expectations and that have long dominated economics. Instead, the mathematical machinery used to characterize M equilibria is semi-algebraic geometry. Interestingly, some of this machinery was developed by Nash himself. The characterization of M equilibria as semi-algebraic sets allows for mathematically precise and empirically testable predictions.

== Definition ==
M equilibrium is based on the following two conditions;

- Ordinal monotonicity: choice probabilities are ranked the same as the expected payoffs based on players' beliefs. This replaces the assumption of "perfect maximization".
- Ordinal consistency: player's beliefs yield the same ranking of expected payoffs as their choices. This replaces the rational expectations or perfect-beliefs assumption.

Let $\sigma^c$ and $\sigma^b$ denote the concatenations of players' choice and belief profiles respectively, and let $rank$ and $\pi$ denote the concatenations of players' rank correspondences and profit functions. We write $\pi(\sigma^b)$ for the profile of expected payoffs based on players' beliefs and $\pi(\sigma^c)$ for the profile of expected payoffs when beliefs are correct, i.e. $\sigma_i^b = \sigma^c$ for $i\in N$. The set of possible choice profiles is $\Sigma = \Pi_{i\in N}\Sigma_i$ and the set of possible belief profiles is $\Sigma^n$.

Definition: We say $(\overline{M^{c}},\overline{M^{b}})\subseteq \Sigma \times \Sigma^n$ form an M Equilibrium if they are the closures of the largest non-empty sets $M^c$ and $M^b$ that satisfy:

$$rank(\sigma^c) \subseteq rank(\pi(\sigma^b)) = rank(\pi(\sigma^c))$$

for all $\sigma^c\in M^c$, $\sigma^b \in M^b$.

== Properties ==
It can be shown that, generically, M equilibria satisfy the following properties:

1. M equilibria have positive measure in $\Sigma \times \Sigma^n$
2. M equilibria are "colorable" by a unique rank vector
3. Nash equilibria arise as boundary points of some M equilibrium

The number of M equilibria can generically be even or odd, and may be less than, equal, or greater than the number of Nash equilibria. Also, any M equilibrium may contain zero, one, or multiple Nash equilibria. Importantly, the measure of any M equilibrium choice set is bounded and decreases exponentially with the number of players and the number of possible choices.

== Meta Theory ==
Surprisingly, M equilibrium "minimally envelopes" various parametric models based on fixed-points, including Quantal Response Equilibrium. Unlike QRE, however, M equilibrium is parameter-free, easy to compute, and does not impose the rational-expectations condition of homogeneous and correct beliefs.

== Behavioral stability ==
The interior of a colored M equilibrium set consists of choices and beliefs that are behaviorally stable. A profile is behaviorally stable when small perturbations in the game do not destroy its equilibrium nature. So an M-equilibrium is behaviorally stable when it remains an M equilibrium even after perturbing the game. Behavioral stability is a strengthening of the concept of strategic stability.

== See also ==
- Bounded rationality
- Behavioral game theory
