= Heinrich Freiherr von Stackelberg =

German economist and noble (1905–1946)

- Born: October 31, 1905; Moscow, Russia
- Died: October 12, 1946 (aged 40); Madrid, Spain
- Known for: Industrial Organization

Academic background
- Education: University of Cologne (Ph.D. and Habilitation)
- Doctoral advisor: Erwin von Beckerath
- Political party: Nazi Party

Baron Heinrich Freiherr von Stackelberg (October 31, 1905 – October 12, 1946) was a German economist who contributed to game theory and industrial organization and is known for the Stackelberg leadership model. Stackelberg became a member of the Nazi Party in 1931 and held the rank of Scharführer (sergeant) in the Schutzstaffel.

== Biography ==
Stackelberg was born in Moscow into a Baltic German noble family from present-day Estonia. His mother was an Argentinian of Spanish descent. After the October Revolution, the family fled to Germany, first to Ratibor and later to Cologne. He studied economics and mathematics at the University of Cologne as an undergraduate. He graduated in 1927 with a thesis on quasi-rent in Alfred Marshall's work (German: Die Quasirente bei Alfred Marshall). He continued his studies as a Ph.D. student in economics under Erwin von Beckerath. He graduated in 1930 with a dissertation on cost theory (German: Die Grundlagen einer reinen Kostentheorie), which was published in 1932 in Vienna. In 1934, he finished his habilitation on market structure and equilibrium (German: Marktform und Gleichgewicht).

After his habilitation he became a lecturer at the University of Cologne. After one semester he accepted a position at the University of Berlin where he taught until 1941. In 1941, Stackelberg became professor of economics at the University of Bonn. In 1944, Stackelberg left Germany for Spain, where he became a visiting professor at the Complutense University of Madrid. He died of lymphoma in 1946. He is buried in the British Cemetery in Madrid.

Stackelberg became a member of the Nazi Party in 1931 and became a Scharführer (sergeant) in the Schutzstaffel in 1933. However, his interactions with many German aristocrats opposed to the Nazi regime (some of whom were within his immediate family), led to his increased disillusionment with that movement to the extent that towards the end of his life he no longer supported it.

== Research ==
The Stackelberg leadership model is a model of a duopoly. In a standard Stackelberg duopoly situation there are two firms in a market. The number of firms is restricted to two by assuming barriers to entry. Each firm is taking into account its competitors' decision on the quantity produced. Unlike in the Cournot game firms act sequentially, with the leader choosing a quantity first. The follower observes the decision of the leader and chooses his quantity.

There are some further constraints upon the sustaining of a Stackelberg equilibrium. The leader must know ex ante that the follower observes his action. The follower must have no means of committing to a future non-Stackelberg follower action and the leader must know this. Indeed, if the 'follower' could commit to a Stackelberg leader action and the 'leader' knew this, the leader's best response would be to play a Stackelberg follower action.

More generally, in a Stackelberg game one player moves before the other player, which can provide either a first-mover advantage or a first-mover disadvantage, depending on the specific assumptions that are made in the game. Other well-known games are the Bertrand game and the Cournot game. The Nash equilibrium plays an important role in solving the Stackelberg game and other games.

== See also ==
- Stackelberg competition

== Publications ==
- Grundlagen einer reinen Kostentheorie (Foundations of Pure Cost Theory), Vienna, 1932
- Marktform und Gleichgewicht (Market Structure and Equilibrium),2011, Translated by Bazin, Damien, Hill, Rowland, Urch, Lynn Vienna, 1934 Website for the book
- Grundlagen der theoretischen Volkswirtschaftslehre (Foundations of Theoretical Economics), Bern, 1948
- The Theory of the Market Economy, London, 1952
- Foundations of a Pure Cost Theory, 2014, Translated by Bazin, Damien, Hill, Rowland, Urch, Lynn Website for the book
