= Non-credible threat =

Concept in game theory

Illustration that shows the difference between a SPNE and another NE. The blue equilibrium is not subgame perfect because player two makes a non-credible threat at 2(2) to be unkind (U).

A non-credible threat is a term used in game theory and economics to describe a threat in a sequential game that a rational player would not actually carry out, because it would not be in their best interest to do so.

A threat, and its counterpart – a commitment, are both defined by American economist and Nobel prize winner, T.C. Schelling, who stated that: "A announces that B's behaviour will lead to a response from A. If this response is a reward, then the announcement is a commitment; if this response is a penalty, then the announcement is a threat." While a player might make a threat, it is only deemed credible if it serves the best interest of the player. In other words, the player would be willing to carry through with the action that is being threatened regardless of the choice of the other player. This is based on the assumption that the player is rational.

A non-credible threat is made on the hope that it will be believed, and therefore the threatening undesirable action will not need to be carried out. For a threat to be credible within an equilibrium, whenever a node is reached where a threat should be fulfilled, it will be fulfilled. Those Nash equilibria that rely on non-credible threats can be eliminated through backward induction; the remaining equilibria are called subgame perfect Nash equilibria.

== Examples of non-credible threats ==
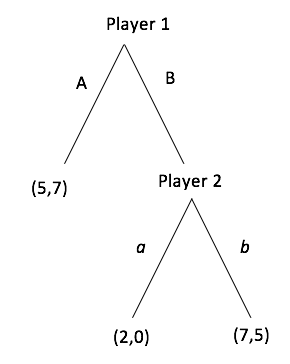
Player 2 threatening action an if Player 1 chooses action B is a non-credible threat. This is because if Player 1 chooses action B, Player 2 will choose action b, as this results in a higher payoff than action a for Player 2.

=== Market entry game ===
An example of a non-credible threat is demonstrated by Shaorong Sun & Na Sun in their book Management Game Theory. The example game, the market entry game, describes a situation in which an existing firm, firm 2, has a strong hold on the market and a new firm, firm 1, is considering entering. If firm 1 doesn't enter, the payoff is (4,10). However, if firm 1 does enter, firm 2 has the choice to either attack or not attack. If firm 2 attacks, the payoff is (3,3) whereas if firm 2 doesn't attack, the payoff is (6,6). Given that firm 2's optimum payoff is firm 1 not entering, it can issue a threat that they will attack if firm 1 enters, to discourage firm 1 from entering the market. However, this is a non-credible threat. If firm 1 does decide to enter the market, the action that is in the best interest for firm 2 is to not attack as this leads to a payoff of 6 for the firm, as opposed to the payoff of 3 from attacking.

=== Eric van Damme's Extensive Form Game ===
Eric van Damme's Extensive Form Game demonstrates another example of a non-credible threat. In this game, player 1 has the choice of L or R, and if player 1 chooses R, then player 2 has the choice of l or r. Player 2 can threaten choosing l with a payoff of (0,0) to entice player 1 to choose L with a payoff of (2,2), as this is the highest payoff for player 2. However, this is a non-credible threat as, if player 1 does decide to choose R, player 2 will choose r as their payoff is 1 as opposed to l which has a payoff of 0 for player 2. Given that action l is not in player 2's best interest, their threat to play that is non-credible.

== Rationality ==
The notion of credibility is contingent on the principle of rationality. A rational player always make decisions that maximise their own utility, however, players are not always rational. Therefore, in real world applications, the assumption that all players will be rational and act to maximise their utility is not practical, thus non-credible threats cannot be ignored.

=== Experiment using the Beard and Beil Game (1994) ===
Nicolas Jacquemet and Adam Zylbersztejn conducted experiments based on the Beard and Beil Game to investigate whether people act to maximise their payoffs. From the study Jacquemet and Zylbersztejn found that failure to maximise utility stemmed from two observations: "subjects are not willing to rely on others’ self-interested maximization, and self-interested maximization is not ubiquitous." A key component of the utility maximising strategy in the game was the elimination of non-credible threats, however, the study found that suboptimal payoffs were a direct result of players following through on these non-credible threats. In real world applications, non-credible threats must be considered as there is a high possibility players will not act rationally.

== See also ==
- Dynamic inconsistency
- Subgame perfect equilibrium
