= William S. Zwicker =

American mathematician

William Seymour Zwicker (born 1949) is an American mathematician and the William D. Williams Professor of Mathematics at Union College in Schenectady, New York.

Zwicker earned a bachelor's degree from Harvard University in 1971, and a Ph.D from Massachusetts Institute of Technology in 1976, under the supervision of Eugene M. Kleinberg. He joined the Union College faculty in 1975, was given his named chair in 2006, and retired in 2021.

Zwicker has done research in set theory and social choice theory. He is credited with inventing the concept of a supergame and the related hypergame paradox. With Alan D. Taylor, he is the author of Simple Games: Desirability Relations, Trading, Pseudoweightings (Princeton University Press, 1999). Zwicker is also known for his work in fair division, including for the Brams–Taylor–Zwicker procedure for envy-free cake cutting.
