= Battle of the sexes (game theory) =

Two-player coordination game in game theory

	Prize Fight	Ballet
Prize Fight	3,2	0,0
Ballet	0,0	2,3
Battle of the Sexes (1)

	Prize Fight	Ballet
Prize Fight	3,2	1,1
Ballet	0,0	2,3
Battle of the Sexes (2)

In game theory, the battle of the sexes is a two-player coordination game that also involves elements of conflict. The game was introduced in 1957 by R. Duncan Luce and Howard Raiffa in their book, Games and Decisions. Some authors prefer to avoid assigning sexes to the players and instead use Players 1 and 2, and some refer to the game as Bach or Stravinsky, using two concerts as the two events. The game description here follows Luce and Raiffa's original story.

Imagine that a man and a woman hope to meet this evening, but have a choice between two events to attend: a prize fight and a ballet. The man would prefer to go to the prize fight. The woman would prefer the ballet. Both would prefer to go to the same event rather than different ones. If they cannot communicate, where should they go?

The payoff matrix labeled "Battle of the Sexes (1)" shows the payoffs when the man chooses a row and the woman chooses a column. In each cell, the first number represents the man's payoff and the second number the woman's.

This standard representation does not account for the additional harm that might come from not only going to different locations, but going to the wrong one as well (e.g. the man goes to the ballet while the woman goes to the prize fight, satisfying neither). To account for this, the game would be represented in "Battle of the Sexes (2)", where in the top right box, the players each have a payoff of 1 because they at least get to attend their favored events.

== Equilibrium analysis ==
This game has two pure strategy Nash equilibria, one where both players go to the prize fight, and another where both go to the ballet. There is also a mixed strategy Nash equilibrium, in which the players randomize using specific probabilities. For the payoffs listed in Battle of the Sexes (1), in the mixed strategy equilibrium the man goes to the prize fight with probability 3/5 and the woman to the ballet with probability 3/5, so they end up together at the prize fight with probability 6/25 = (3/5)(2/5) and together at the ballet with probability 6/25 = (2/5)(3/5).

This presents an interesting case for game theory since each of the Nash equilibria is deficient in some way. The two pure strategy Nash equilibria are unfair; one player consistently does better than the other. The mixed strategy Nash equilibrium is inefficient: the players will miscoordinate with probability 13/25, leaving each player with an expected return of 6/5 (less than the payoff of 2 from each's less favored pure strategy equilibrium). It remains unclear how expectations would form that would result in a particular equilibrium being played out.

One possible resolution of the difficulty involves the use of a correlated equilibrium. In its simplest form, if the players of the game have access to a commonly observed randomizing device, then they might decide to correlate their strategies in the game based on the outcome of the device. For example, if the players could flip a coin before choosing their strategies, they might agree to correlate their strategies based on the coin flip by, say, choosing ballet in the event of heads and prize fight in the event of tails. Notice that once the results of the coin flip are revealed neither player has any incentives to alter their proposed actions if they believe the other will not. The result is that perfect coordination is always achieved and, prior to the coin flip, the expected payoffs for the players are exactly equal. It remains true, however, that even if there is a correlating device, the Nash equilibria in which the players ignore it will remain; correlated equilibria require both the existence of a correlating device and the expectation that both players will use it to make their decision.
