= Finite game =

Concept in logic

In game theory, a finite game (sometimes called a founded game or a well-founded game) is a two-player game that is assured to end after a finite number of moves. Finite games may have an infinite number of possibilities or even an unbounded number of moves, so long as they are guaranteed to end in a finite number of turns.

== Totally Finite Games ==
William Zwicker defined a game, G, to be totally finite if it met the following five conditions:

1. Two players, I and II, move alternately, I going first. Each has complete knowledge of the other's moves.
2. There is no chance involved.
3. There are no ties (when a play of G is complete, there is one winner).
4. Every play ends after finitely many moves.
5. At any point in a play of G, there are but finitely many legal possibilities for the next move.

== Examples ==
- Tic Tac Toe
- Chess
- Checkers
- Poker
- The game where player one chooses any number and immediately wins (this is an example of a finite game with infinite possibilities)
- The game where player one names any number N, then N moves pass with nothing happening before player one wins (this is an example of a finite game with an unbounded number of moves)

== Supergame ==
A supergame is a variant of the finite game invented by William Zwicker. Zwicker defined a supergame to have the following rules:

"On the first move, I name any totally finite game G (called the subgame). The players then proceed to play G, with II playing the role of I while G is being played. The winner of the play of the subgame is declared to be the winner of the play of the supergame."

Zwicker notes that a supergame satisfies properties 1-4 of a totally finite game, but not property 5. He defines games of this type to be somewhat finite.

== Hypergame paradox ==
A hypergame has the same rules as a super game except that I may name any somewhat finite game on the first move. The hypergame is closely related to the "hypergame paradox" a self-referential, set-theoretic paradox like Russell's paradox and Cantor's paradox.

The hypergame paradox arises from trying to answer the question "Is a hypergame somewhat finite?" The paradox, as Zwicker note, satisfies conditions 1- 4 making it somewhat finite in the same way a supergame was. However, if hypergame is a somewhat finite game, then play can proceed infinitely with both players choosing hypergame as their subgame forever. This infinite would appear to violate property 4, making the hypergame not somewhat finite. Thus, the paradox.
