= Non-cooperative game theory =

Type of game involving individual competition

In game theory, a non-cooperative game is a game in which there are no external rules or binding agreements that enforce the cooperation of the players. A non-cooperative game is typically used to model a competitive environment. This is stated in various accounts most prominent being John Nash's 1951 paper in the journal Annals of Mathematics.

Counterintuitively, non-cooperative game models can be used to model cooperation as well, and vice versa, cooperative game theory can be used to model competition. Some examples of this would be the use of non-cooperative game models in determining the stability and sustainability of cartels and coalitions.

== The difference between cooperative and non-cooperative game theory ==
The terminology of cooperative and non-cooperative game theory does not imply that the players can only "cooperate" in one case and not another. Rather, the distinction between the two branches of game theory lies in the assumption regarding the institutional structure.

The distinction between the two branches of game theory was introduced by John Nash, who wrote

[Cooperative game theory] is based on an analysis of the interrelationships of the various coalitions which can be formed by the players of the game. Our [non-cooperative game theory], in contradistinction, is based on the absence of coalitions in that it is assumed that each participant acts independently, without collaboration or communication with any of the others.

Non-cooperative game theory models different situations in which agents are unable to reach a resolution to a conflict that enforces some action on one another. This form of game theory pays close attention to the individuals involved and their rational decision making. There are winners and losers in each case, and yet agents may end up in Pareto-inferior outcomes, where every agent is worse off and there is a potential outcome for every agent to be better off. Agents will have the ability to predict what their opponents will do. Cooperative game theory models situations in which a binding agreement is possible. In other words, the cooperative game theory implies that agents cooperate to achieve a common goal and they are not necessarily referred to as a team because the correct term is the coalition. Each agent has its skills or contributions that provide strength to the coalition.

Further, it has been supposed that non-cooperative game theory is purported to analyse the effect of independent decisions on society as a whole. In comparison, cooperative game theory focuses only on the effects of participants in a certain coalition, when the coalition attempts to improve the collective welfare.

Many results or solutions proposed by the agents involved in Game Theory are important in understanding the rivalry between these agents under a set of conditions that are strategic.

== Elements of a non-cooperative game ==
To specify a non-cooperative game completely, one must specify

1. The number of players,
2. The actions available to each player at any given state of the game,
3. The function that each player is attempting to maximize,
4. The time ordering of actions (if needed),
5. How information is acquired by the players.
6. Whether there is any randomness in the game.

The following assumptions are commonly made:

1. Perfect recall: each player remembers their decisions and known information.
2. Self-interest: each player does not consider the effect of actions on the others but only on their own.
3. Rational: each player is interested to maximise their utility or payoff.
4. Complete information: each player knows the preferences and strategies of the other players.
5. Each player has the same understanding of how the game works.

== Examples ==
Strategic games are a form of non-cooperative game, where only the available strategies and combinations of options are listed to produce outcomes.

=== Rock paper scissors ===
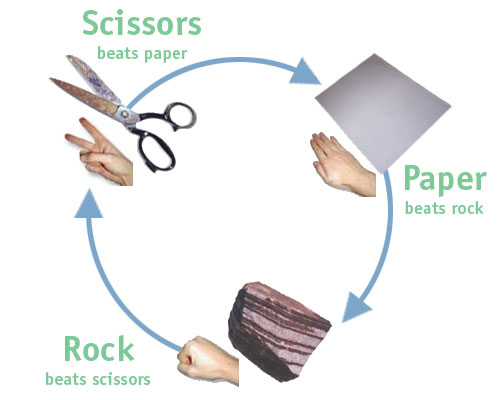

In the game of rock-paper-scissors, if Player 1 decides to play "rock", it is in Player 2's interest to play "paper"; if Player 2 chooses to play "paper", it is in Player 1's interest to play "scissors"; and if Player 1 plays "scissors", Player 2 will, in their own interests, play "rock".

=== Prisoner's dilemma ===
A standard-form prisoner's dilemma game

The prisoner's dilemma game is another well-known example of a non-cooperative game. The game involves two players, or defendants, who are kept in separate rooms and thus are unable to communicate. Players must decide, by themselves in isolation, whether to cooperate with the other player or to betray them and confess to law authorities. As shown in the diagram, both players will receive a higher payoff in the form of a lower jail sentence if they both remain silent. If both confess, they receive a lower payoff in the form of a higher jail sentence. If one player confesses and the other remain silent and cooperates, the confessor will receive a higher payoff, while the silent player will receive a lower payoff than if both players cooperated with each other.

The Nash equilibrium therefore lies where players both betray each other, in the players protecting oneself from being punished more.

=== The battle of the sexes ===
The game involves two players, boy and girl, deciding either going to a football game or going to an opera for their date, which respectively represent boy's and girl's preferred activity (i.e. boy prefers football game and girl prefers opera). This example is a two-person non-cooperative non-zero sum (TNNC) game with opposite payoffs or conflicting preferences. Because there are two Nash equilibria, this case is a pure coordination problem with no possibility of refinement or selection. Thus, the two players will try to maximise their own payoff or to sacrifice for the other and yet these strategies without coordination will lead to two outcomes with even worse payoffs for both if they disagree on what to do on their date.

The battle of the sexes game
| Boy/ Girl | Football | Opera |
|---|---|---|
| Football | (2, 1) | (-1, -1) |
| Opera | (-1, -1) | (1, 2) |

=== Matching pennies game ===
This game is a two-person zero-sum game. In order to play this game, both players will each need to be given a fair two-sided penny. To start the game, both player will each choose to either flip their penny to heads or tails. This action is to be done in secrecy and there should be no attempt at investigating the choice of the other player. After both players have confirmed their decisions, they will simultaneously reveal their choices. This concludes the actions taken by the players to determine the outcome.

The win condition for this game is different for both players. For simplicity in explanation, lets denote the players as Player 1 and Player 2. In order for Player 1 to win, the faces of the pennies must match (This means they must both be heads or tails). In order for Player 2 to win, the faces of the pennies must be different (This means that they must be in a combination of heads and tails).

The payoff/prize of this game is receiving the loser's penny in addition to your own.

Therefore the payoff matrix will look like this:

| Player1 \ Player 2 | Heads | Tails |
| Heads | 1, -1 | -1, 1 |
| Tails | -1, 1 | 1, -1 |

Looking at this matrix, we can conclude a few basic observations.

1. For all scenarios, there will be a loser and a winner.
2. This is a zero sum game where the pay out to the winner is equal to the loss of the loser.
3. There is no Pure Strategy Nash Equilibrium.

== Analysis ==
Non-cooperative games are generally analysed through the non-cooperative game theory framework, which attempts to predict players' individual strategies and payoffs and in order to find the Nash equilibria. This framework often requires a detailed knowledge in the possible actions and the levels of information of each player. It is opposed to cooperative game theory, which focuses on predicting which groups of players ("coalitions") will form, the joint actions that these groups will take, and the resulting collective payoffs that arise. Cooperative game theory does not analyse the strategic bargaining that occurs within each coalition and affects the distribution of the collective payoff between the members. Further in contrast to cooperative game theory, it is assumed that players involved have prior knowledge of their game in which they are involved, due to built in commitments.

Non-cooperative game theory provides a low-level approach as it models all the procedural details of the game, whereas cooperative game theory only describes the structure, strategies and payoffs of coalitions. Therefore, cooperative game theory is referred to as coalitional, and non-cooperative game theory is procedural. Non-cooperative game theory is in this sense more inclusive than cooperative game theory.

It is also more general, as cooperative games can be analysed using the terms of non-cooperative game theory where arbitration is available to enforce an agreement, that agreement falls outside the scope of non-cooperative theory: but it may be possible to state sufficient assumptions to encompass all the possible strategies players may adopt, in relation to arbitration. This will bring the agreement within the scope of non-cooperative theory. Alternatively, it may be possible to describe the arbitrator as a party to the agreement and model the relevant processes and payoffs suitably.

Accordingly, it would be desirable to have all games expressed under a non-cooperative framework. But in many instances insufficient information is available to accurately model the formal procedures available to the players during the strategic bargaining process; or the resulting model would be of too high complexity to offer a practical tool in the real world. In such cases, cooperative game theory provides a simplified approach that allows analysis of the game at large without having to make any assumption about bargaining powers.

Additionally, we must also look at the limitations that the non-cooperative model may have. We can have a clearer picture when looking at the list of assumptions stated above. As already mentioned, there are many scenarios where perfect symmetry of information is not possible which therefore results in the decision making process to be flawed.

Secondly, the assumption of self-interest and rationality could be argued. Arguments are made that being rational can result in the assumption of self-interest being invalidated and vice versa. One such example could be the reduction in profits and revenue in attempts to drive out competitors for a higher market share. This thus does not follow both of the assumptions as the player is concerned with the downfall of their opponent more than the maximisation of their profits. There is the argument to be made that although mathematically sound and feasible, it is not necessarily the best method of looking at real life economical problems that are more complex in nature.

== Solutions ==
Solutions in non-cooperative games are similar to all other games in game theory, but without the ones involved binding agreements enforced by the external authority. The solutions are normally based on the concept of Nash equilibrium, and these solutions are reached by using methods listed in Solution concept. Most solutions used in non-cooperative game are refinements developed from Nash equilibrium, including the minimax mixed-strategy proved by John von Neumann.

== See also ==
- Mutual assured destruction – Doctrine of military strategy
- Grim trigger – Trigger strategy
- Intra-household bargaining
- Proper equilibrium – Solution concept in game theory
- Tit for tat – English saying meaning "equivalent retaliation"
- Trembling hand perfect equilibrium – Variant of Nash equilibrium in game theory
- Trigger strategy – Class of strategies employed in a repeated non-cooperative game
- War of attrition (game) – Game theory model of aggression
- Game theory – Mathematical models of strategic interactions
