= Nash equilibrium =

Solution concept of a non-cooperative game

- Solution concept in game theory

Relationship
- Subset of: Rationalizability, Epsilon-equilibrium, Correlated equilibrium
- Superset of: Evolutionarily stable strategy, Subgame perfect equilibrium, Perfect Bayesian equilibrium, Trembling hand perfect equilibrium, Stable Nash equilibrium, Strong Nash equilibrium

Significance
- Proposed by: John Forbes Nash Jr.
- Used for: All non-cooperative games

In game theory, a Nash equilibrium is a situation where no player could gain more by changing their own strategy (holding all other players' strategies fixed) in a game. A Nash equilibrium is the most commonly used solution concept for non-cooperative games.

If each player has chosen a strategy — an action plan based on what has happened so far in the game — and no individual player can increase their own expected payoff by changing their strategy while the other players keep theirs unchanged, then the current set of strategy choices constitutes a Nash equilibrium.

If two players Alice and Bob choose strategies A and B, (A, B) is a Nash equilibrium if Alice has no other strategy available that does better than A at maximizing her payoff in response to Bob choosing B, and Bob has no other strategy available that does better than B at maximizing his payoff in response to Alice choosing A. In a game in which Carol and Dan are also players, (A, B, C, D) is a Nash equilibrium if A is Alice's best response to (B, C, D), B is Bob's best response to (A, C, D), and so forth.

The concept of a Nash equilibrium dates back to the time of Cournot, who in 1838 applied it to his model of competition in an oligopoly. John Nash showed that there is a Nash equilibrium, possibly in mixed strategies, for every finite game.

== Applications ==
Game theorists use Nash equilibrium to analyze the outcome of the strategic interaction of several decision makers. In a strategic interaction, the outcome for each decision-maker depends on the decisions of the others as well as their own. The insight underlying Nash's idea is that one cannot predict the choices of multiple decision makers if one analyzes those decisions in isolation. Instead, one must ask what each player would do taking into account what the player expects the others to do. A Nash equilibrium is achieved when no player can improve their outcome by changing their decision, assuming the other players' choices remain unchanged.

The concept has been used to analyze hostile situations such as wars and arms races (see prisoner's dilemma), and also how conflict may be mitigated by repeated interaction (see tit-for-tat). It has also been used to study to what extent people with different preferences can cooperate (see battle of the sexes), and whether they will take risks to achieve a cooperative outcome (see stag hunt). It has been used to study the adoption of technical standards, and also the occurrence of bank runs and currency crises (see coordination game). Other applications include traffic flow (see Wardrop's principle), how to organize auctions (see auction theory), the outcome of efforts exerted by multiple parties in the education process, regulatory legislation such as environmental regulations (see tragedy of the commons), natural resource management, analysing strategies in marketing, penalty kicks in football (i.e., soccer; see matching pennies), robot navigation in crowds, energy systems, transportation systems, evacuation problems and wireless communications.

== History ==
Nash equilibrium is named after American mathematician John Forbes Nash Jr. The same idea was used in a particular application in 1838 by Antoine Augustin Cournot in his theory of oligopoly. In Cournot's theory, each of several firms choose how much output to produce to maximize its profit. The best output for one firm depends on the outputs of the others. A Cournot equilibrium occurs when each firm's output maximizes its profits given the output of the other firms, which is a pure-strategy Nash equilibrium. Cournot also introduced the concept of best response dynamics in his analysis of the stability of equilibrium. Cournot did not use the idea in any other applications, however, or define it generally.

The modern concept of Nash equilibrium is instead defined in terms of mixed strategies, where players choose a probability distribution over possible pure strategies (which might put 100% of the probability on one pure strategy; such pure strategies are a subset of mixed strategies). The concept of a mixed-strategy equilibrium was introduced by John von Neumann and Oskar Morgenstern in their 1944 book The Theory of Games and Economic Behavior, but their analysis was restricted to the special case of zero-sum games. They showed that a mixed-strategy Nash equilibrium will exist for any zero-sum game with a finite set of actions. The contribution of Nash in his 1951 article "Non-Cooperative Games" was to define a mixed-strategy Nash equilibrium for any game with a finite set of actions and prove that at least one (mixed-strategy) Nash equilibrium must exist in such a game. The key to Nash's ability to prove existence far more generally than von Neumann lay in his definition of equilibrium. According to Nash, "an equilibrium point is an n-tuple such that each player's mixed strategy maximizes [their] payoff if the strategies of the others are held fixed. Thus each player's strategy is optimal against those of the others." Putting the problem in this framework allowed Nash to employ the Kakutani fixed-point theorem in his 1950 paper to prove existence of equilibria. His 1951 paper used the simpler Brouwer fixed-point theorem for the same purpose.

Game theorists have discovered that in some circumstances Nash equilibrium makes invalid predictions or fails to make a unique prediction. They have proposed many solution concepts ('refinements' of Nash equilibria) designed to rule out implausible Nash equilibria. One particularly important issue is that some Nash equilibria may be based on threats that are not 'credible'. In 1965 Reinhard Selten proposed subgame perfect equilibrium as a refinement that eliminates equilibria which depend on non-credible threats. Other extensions of the Nash equilibrium concept have addressed what happens if a game is repeated, or what happens if a game is played in the absence of complete information. However, subsequent refinements and extensions of Nash equilibrium share the main insight on which Nash's concept rests: the equilibrium is a set of strategies such that each player's strategy is optimal given the choices of the others.

== Definitions ==
A strategy profile is a set of strategies, one for each player. Informally, a strategy profile is a Nash equilibrium if no player can do better by unilaterally changing their strategy. To see what this means, imagine that each player is told the strategies of the others. Suppose then that each player asks themselves: "Knowing the strategies of the other players, and treating the strategies of the other players as set in stone, can I benefit by changing my strategy?"

For instance if a player prefers "Yes", then that set of strategies is not a Nash equilibrium. But if every player prefers not to switch (or is indifferent between switching and not) then the strategy profile is a Nash equilibrium. Thus, each strategy in a Nash equilibrium is a best response to the other players' strategies in that equilibrium.

Formally, let $S_i$ be the set of all possible strategies for player $i$, where $i = 1, \ldots, N$. Let $s^* = (s_i^*, s_{-i}^*)$ be a strategy profile, a set consisting of one strategy for each player, where $s_{-i}^*$ denotes the $N - 1$ strategies of all the players except $i$. Let $u_i(s_i, s_{-i}^*)$ be player i's payoff as a function of the strategies. The strategy profile $s^*$ is a Nash equilibrium if
$$u_i(s_i^*, s_{-i}^*) \geq u_i(s_i, s_{-i}^*)\ \text{for all}\ s_i \in S_i.$$

A game can have more than one Nash equilibrium. Even if the equilibrium is unique, it might be weak: a player might be indifferent among several strategies given the other players' choices. It is unique and called a strict Nash equilibrium if the inequality is strict so one strategy is the unique best response:
$$u_i(s_i^*, s_{-i}^*) > u_i(s_i, s_{-i}^*)\ \text{for all}\ s_i \in S_i, s_i \neq s_i^*.$$

The strategy set $S_i$ can be different for different players, and its elements can be a variety of mathematical objects. Most simply, a player might choose between two strategies, e.g. $S_i = \{\text{Yes}, \text{No}\}.$ Or the strategy set might be a finite set of conditional strategies responding to other players, e.g. $S_i = \{\text{Yes} \mid p = \text{Low}, \text{No} \mid p = \text{High}\}.$ Or it might be an infinite set, a continuum or unbounded, e.g. $S_i = \{\text{Price}\}$ such that $\text{Price}$ is a non-negative real number. Nash's existence proofs assume a finite strategy set, but the concept of Nash equilibrium does not require it.

== Variants ==
=== Pure/mixed equilibrium ===
A game can have a pure-strategy or a mixed-strategy Nash equilibrium. In the latter, not every player always plays the same strategy. Instead, there is a probability distribution over different strategies.

=== Strict/non-strict equilibrium ===
Suppose that in the Nash equilibrium, each player asks themselves: "Knowing the strategies of the other players, and treating the strategies of the other players as set in stone, would I suffer a loss by changing my strategy?"

If every player's answer is "Yes", then the equilibrium is classified as a strict Nash equilibrium.

If instead, for some player, there is exact equality between the strategy in Nash equilibrium and some other strategy that gives exactly the same payout (i.e., the player is indifferent between switching and not), then the equilibrium is classified as a weak (Note: This term is dispreferred, as it can also mean the opposite of a "strong" Nash equilibrium (i.e. a Nash equilibrium that is vulnerable to manipulation by groups).) or non-strict Nash equilibrium.

=== Equilibria for coalitions ===
The Nash equilibrium defines stability only in terms of individual player deviations. In cooperative games such a concept is not convincing enough. Strong Nash equilibrium allows for deviations by every conceivable coalition. Formally, a strong Nash equilibrium is a Nash equilibrium in which no coalition, taking the actions of its complements as given, can cooperatively deviate in a way that benefits all of its members. However, the strong Nash concept is sometimes perceived as too "strong" in that the environment allows for unlimited private communication. In fact, strong Nash equilibrium has to be weakly Pareto efficient. As a result of these requirements, strong Nash is too rare to be useful in many branches of game theory. However, in games such as elections with many more players than possible outcomes, it can be more common than a stable equilibrium.

A refined Nash equilibrium known as coalition-proof Nash equilibrium (CPNE) occurs when players cannot do better even if they are allowed to communicate and make "self-enforcing" agreement to deviate. Every correlated strategy supported by iterated strict dominance and on the Pareto frontier is a CPNE. Further, it is possible for a game to have a Nash equilibrium that is resilient against coalitions less than a specified size, k. CPNE is related to the theory of the core.

== Existence ==
Nash proved that if mixed strategies (where a player chooses probabilities of using various pure strategies) are allowed, then every game with a finite number of players in which each player can choose from finitely many pure strategies has at least one Nash equilibrium, which might be a pure strategy for each player or might be a probability distribution over strategies for each player.

Nash equilibria need not exist if the set of choices is infinite and non-compact. For example:

- A game where two players simultaneously name a number and the player naming the larger number wins does not have a NE, as the set of choices is not compact because it is unbounded.
- Each of two players chooses a real number strictly less than 5 and the winner is whoever has the biggest number; no biggest number strictly less than 5 exists (if the number could equal 5, the Nash equilibrium would have both players choosing 5 and tying the game). Here, the set of choices is not compact because it is not closed.

However, a Nash equilibrium exists if the set of choices is compact with each player's payoff continuous in the strategies of all the players.

== Generalizations ==
Nash's existence theorem has been extended to more general classes of games.

=== Games with coupled constraints ===
In Nash's model, the set of strategies available to each player is fixed and does not depend on the other players' strategies. A more general model allows these sets to depend on other players' strategies; this is often called coupled constraints. In Nash's model, the set of possible strategy-profiles is a Cartesian product of the players' strategy sets, whereas in the more general model it can be an arbitrary set. When there are coupled constraints, the equilibrium is often called Generalized Nash equilibrium (GNE).

Rosen proved that, if the set of strategy-profiles is any convex set, and the utility function of each player is continuous in all strategies and a concave function of the player's own strategy, then a GNE exists; see concave games.

=== Non-atomic games ===
Nash considered games with finitely many players, in non-atomic games the set of players is infinite - there is a continuum of players David Schmeidler proved that an equilibrium exists under certain conditions.

== Rationality ==
The Nash equilibrium may sometimes appear non-rational in a third-person perspective. This is because a Nash equilibrium is not necessarily Pareto optimal.

Nash equilibrium may also have non-rational consequences in sequential games because players may "threaten" each other with threats they would not actually carry out. For such games the subgame perfect Nash equilibrium may be more meaningful as a tool of analysis.

== Examples ==
=== Coordination game ===
A coordination game showing payoffs for player 1 (row) and player 2 (column)
Player 1 strategy	Player 2 strategy	
Player 1 strategy	A	B
A	4 4	3 1
B	1 3	2 2

The coordination game is a classic two-player, two-strategy game, as shown in the example payoff matrix to the right. There are two pure-strategy equilibria, (A,A) with payoff 4 for each player and (B,B) with payoff 2 for each. The combination (B,B) is a Nash equilibrium because if either player unilaterally changes their strategy from B to A, their payoff will fall from 2 to 1.

The stag hunt
Player 1 strategy	Player 2 strategy	
Player 1 strategy	Hunt stag	Hunt rabbit
Hunt stag	2 2	1 0
Hunt rabbit	0 1	1 1

A famous example of a coordination game is the stag hunt. Two players may choose to hunt a stag or a rabbit, the stag providing more meat (4 utility units, 2 for each player) than the rabbit (1 utility unit). The caveat is that the stag must be cooperatively hunted, so if one player attempts to hunt the stag, while the other hunts the rabbit, the stag hunter will totally fail, for a payoff of 0, whereas the rabbit hunter will succeed, for a payoff of 1. The game has two equilibria, (stag, stag) and (rabbit, rabbit), because a player's optimal strategy depends on their expectation on what the other player will do. If one hunter trusts that the other will hunt the stag, they should hunt the stag; however if they think the other will hunt the rabbit, they too will hunt the rabbit. This game is used as an analogy for social cooperation, since much of the benefit that people gain in society depends upon people cooperating and implicitly trusting one another to act in a manner corresponding with cooperation.

Driving on a road against an oncoming car, and having to choose either to swerve on the left or to swerve on the right of the road, is also a coordination game. For example, with payoffs 10 meaning no crash and 0 meaning a crash, the coordination game can be defined with the following payoff matrix:

The driving game
Player 1 strategy	Player 2 strategy	
Player 1 strategy	Drive on the left	Drive on the right
Drive on the left	10 10	0 0
Drive on the right	0 0	10 10

In this case there are two pure-strategy Nash equilibria, when both choose to either drive on the left or on the right. If we admit mixed strategies (where a pure strategy is chosen at random, subject to some fixed probability), then there are three Nash equilibria for the same case: two we have seen from the pure-strategy form, where the probabilities are (0%, 100%) for player one, (0%, 100%) for player two; and (100%, 0%) for player one, (100%, 0%) for player two respectively. We add another where the probabilities for each player are (50%, 50%).

=== Network traffic ===
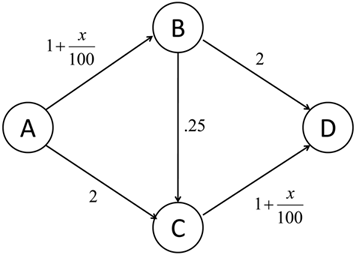
Sample network graph. Values on edges are the travel time experienced by a "car" traveling down that edge. $x$ is the number of cars traveling via that edge.

An application of Nash equilibria is in determining the expected flow of traffic in a network. Consider the graph on the right. If we assume that there are $x$ "cars" traveling from A to D, what is the expected distribution of traffic in the network?

This situation can be modeled as a "game", where every traveler has a choice of 3 strategies and where each strategy is a route from A to D (one of ABD, ABCD, or ACD). The "payoff" of each strategy is the travel time of each route. In the graph on the right, a car travelling via ABD experiences travel time of $1+\frac{x}{100}+2$, where $x$ is the number of cars traveling on edge AB. Thus, payoffs for any given strategy depend on the choices of the other players, as is usual. However, the goal, in this case, is to minimize travel time, not maximize it. Equilibrium will occur when the time on all paths is exactly the same. When that happens, no single driver has any incentive to switch routes, since it can only add to their travel time. For the graph on the right, if, for example, 100 cars are travelling from A to D, then equilibrium will occur when 25 drivers travel via ABD, 50 via ABCD, and 25 via ACD. Every driver now has a total travel time of 3.75 (to see this, a total of 75 cars take the AB edge, and likewise, 75 cars take the CD edge).

Notice that this distribution is not, actually, socially optimal. If the 100 cars agreed that 50 travel via ABD and the other 50 through ACD, then travel time for any single car would actually be 3.5, which is less than 3.75. This is also the Nash equilibrium if the path between B and C is removed, which means that adding another possible route can decrease the efficiency of the system, a phenomenon known as Braess's paradox.

=== Competition game ===
A competition game
Player 1 strategy	Player 2 strategy			
Player 1 strategy	Choose "0"	Choose "1"	Choose "2"	Choose "3"
Choose "0"	0, 0	2, −2	2, −2	2, −2
Choose "1"	−2, 2	1, 1	3, −1	3, −1
Choose "2"	−2, 2	−1, 3	2, 2	4, 0
Choose "3"	−2, 2	−1, 3	0, 4	3, 3

This can be illustrated by a two-player game in which both players simultaneously choose an integer from 0 to 3 and they both win the smaller of the two numbers in points. In addition, if one player chooses a larger number than the other, then they have to give up two points to the other.

This game has a unique pure-strategy Nash equilibrium: both players choosing 0 (highlighted in light red). Any other strategy can be improved by a player switching their number to one less than that of the other player. In the adjacent table, if the game begins at the green square, it is in player 1's interest to move to the purple square and it is in player 2's interest to move to the blue square. Although it would not fit the definition of a competition game, if the game is modified so that the two players win the named amount if they both choose the same number, and otherwise win nothing, then there are 4 Nash equilibria: (0,0), (1,1), (2,2), and (3,3).

=== Nash equilibria in a payoff matrix ===
There is an easy numerical way to identify Nash equilibria on a payoff matrix. It is especially helpful in two-person games where players have more than two strategies. In this case formal analysis may become too long. This rule does not apply to the case where mixed (stochastic) strategies are of interest. The rule goes as follows: if the first payoff number, in the payoff pair of the cell, is the maximum of the column of the cell and if the second number is the maximum of the row of the cell – then the cell represents a Nash equilibrium.

We can apply this rule to a 3×3 matrix:

A payoff matrix – Nash equilibria in bold
Player 1 strategy	Player 2 strategy		
Player 1 strategy	Option A	Option B	Option C
Option A	0, 0	**25, 40**	5, 10
Option B	**40, 25**	0, 0	5, 15
Option C	10, 5	15, 5	**10, 10**

Using the rule, we can very quickly (much faster than with formal analysis) see that the Nash equilibria cells are (B,A), (A,B), and (C,C). Indeed, for cell (B,A), 40 is the maximum of the first column and 25 is the maximum of the second row. For (A,B), 25 is the maximum of the second column and 40 is the maximum of the first row; the same applies for cell (C,C). For other cells, either one or both of the duplet members are not the maximum of the corresponding rows and columns.

This said, the actual mechanics of finding equilibrium cells is obvious: find the maximum of a column and check if the second member of the pair is the maximum of the row. If these conditions are met, the cell represents a Nash equilibrium. Check all columns this way to find all NE cells. An N×N matrix may have between 0 and N×N pure-strategy Nash equilibria.

== Stability ==
The concept of stability, useful in the analysis of many kinds of equilibria, can also be applied to Nash equilibria.

A Nash equilibrium for a mixed-strategy game is stable if a small change (specifically, an infinitesimal change) in probabilities for one player leads to a situation where two conditions hold:

1. the player who did not change has no better strategy in the new circumstance
2. the player who did change is now playing with a strictly worse strategy.

If these cases are both met, then a player with the small change in their mixed strategy will return immediately to the Nash equilibrium. The equilibrium is said to be stable. If condition one does not hold then the equilibrium is unstable. If only condition one holds then there are likely to be an infinite number of optimal strategies for the player who changed.

In the "driving game" example above there are both stable and unstable equilibria. The equilibria involving mixed strategies with 100% probabilities are stable. If either player changes their probabilities slightly, they will be both at a disadvantage, and their opponent will have no reason to change their strategy in turn. The (50%,50%) equilibrium is unstable. If either player changes their probabilities (which would neither benefit or damage the expectation of the player who did the change, if the other player's mixed strategy is still (50%,50%)), then the other player immediately has a better strategy at either (0%, 100%) or (100%, 0%).

Stability is crucial in practical applications of Nash equilibria, since the mixed strategy of each player is not perfectly known, but has to be inferred from statistical distribution of their actions in the game. In this case unstable equilibria are very unlikely to arise in practice, since any minute change in the proportions of each strategy seen will lead to a change in strategy and the breakdown of the equilibrium.

Finally in the eighties, building with great depth on such ideas Mertens-stable equilibria were introduced as a solution concept. Mertens stable equilibria satisfy both forward induction and backward induction. In a game theory context stable equilibria now usually refer to Mertens stable equilibria.

== Occurrence ==
If a game has a unique Nash equilibrium and is played among players under certain conditions, then the NE strategy set will be adopted. Sufficient conditions to guarantee that the Nash equilibrium is played are:

1. The players all will do their utmost to maximize their expected payoff as described by the game.
2. The players are flawless in execution.
3. The players have sufficient intelligence to deduce the solution.
4. The players know the planned equilibrium strategy of all of the other players.
5. The players believe that a deviation in their own strategy will not cause deviations by any other players.
6. There is common knowledge that all players meet these conditions, including this one. So, not only must each player know the other players meet the conditions, but also they must know that they all know that they meet them, and know that they know that they know that they meet them, and so on.

=== Where the conditions are not met ===
Examples of game theory problems in which these conditions are not met:

1. The first condition is not met if the game does not correctly describe the quantities a player wishes to maximize. In this case there is no particular reason for that player to adopt an equilibrium strategy. For instance, the prisoner's dilemma is not a dilemma if either player is happy to be jailed indefinitely.
2. Intentional or accidental imperfection in execution. For example, a computer capable of flawless logical play facing a second flawless computer will result in equilibrium. Introduction of imperfection will lead to its disruption either through loss to the player who makes the mistake, or through negation of the common knowledge criterion leading to possible victory for the player. (An example would be a player suddenly putting the car into reverse in the game of chicken, ensuring a no-loss no-win scenario).
3. In many cases, the third condition is not met because, even though the equilibrium must exist, it is unknown due to the complexity of the game, for instance in Chinese chess. Or, if known, it may not be known to all players, as when playing tic-tac-toe with a small child who desperately wants to win (meeting the other criteria).
4. The criterion of common knowledge may not be met even if all players do, in fact, meet all the other criteria. Players wrongly distrusting each other's rationality may adopt counter-strategies to expected irrational play on their opponents’ behalf. This is a major consideration in "chicken" or an arms race, for example.

=== Where the conditions are met ===
In his Ph.D. dissertation, John Nash proposed two interpretations of his equilibrium concept, with the objective of showing how equilibrium points can be connected with observable phenomena.

(...) One interpretation is rationalistic: if we assume that players are rational, know the full structure of the game, the game is played just once, and there is just one Nash equilibrium, then players will play according to that equilibrium.

This idea was formalized by R. Aumann and A. Brandenburger, 1995, Epistemic Conditions for Nash Equilibrium, Econometrica, 63, 1161-1180 who interpreted each player's mixed strategy as a conjecture about the behaviour of other players and have shown that if the game and the rationality of players is mutually known and these conjectures are commonly known, then the conjectures must be a Nash equilibrium (a common prior assumption is needed for this result in general, but not in the case of two players. In this case, the conjectures need only be mutually known).

A second interpretation, that Nash referred to by the mass action interpretation, is less demanding on players:

[i]t is unnecessary to assume that the participants have full knowledge of the total structure of the game, or the ability and inclination to go through any complex reasoning processes. What is assumed is that there is a population of participants for each position in the game, which will be played throughout time by participants drawn at random from the different populations. If there is a stable average frequency with which each pure strategy is employed by the average member of the appropriate population, then this stable average frequency constitutes a mixed strategy Nash equilibrium.

For a formal result along these lines, see Kuhn, H. and et al., 1996, "The Work of John Nash in Game Theory", Journal of Economic Theory, 69, 153–185.

Due to the limited conditions in which NE can actually be observed, they are rarely treated as a guide to day-to-day behaviour, or observed in practice in human negotiations. However, as a theoretical concept in economics and evolutionary biology, the NE has explanatory power. The payoff in economics is utility (or sometimes money), and in evolutionary biology is gene transmission; both are the fundamental bottom line of survival. Researchers who apply games theory in these fields claim that strategies failing to maximize these for whatever reason will be competed out of the market or environment, which are ascribed the ability to test all strategies. This conclusion is drawn from the "stability" theory above. In these situations the assumption that the strategy observed is actually a NE has often been borne out by research.

== NE and non-credible threats ==
Extensive and normal-form illustrations that show the difference between SPNE and other NE. The blue equilibrium is not subgame perfect because player two makes a non-credible threat at 2(2) to be unkind (U).

The Nash equilibrium is a superset of the subgame perfect Nash equilibrium. The subgame perfect equilibrium in addition to the Nash equilibrium requires that the strategy also is a Nash equilibrium in every subgame of that game. This eliminates all non-credible threats, that is, strategies that contain non-rational moves in order to make the counter-player change their strategy.

The image to the right shows a simple sequential game that illustrates the issue with subgame imperfect Nash equilibria. In this game player one chooses left(L) or right(R), which is followed by player two being called upon to be kind (K) or unkind (U) to player one, However, player two only stands to gain from being unkind if player one goes left. If player one goes right the rational player two would de facto be kind to her/him in that subgame. However, The non-credible threat of being unkind at 2(2) is still part of the blue (L, (U,U)) Nash equilibrium. Therefore, if rational behavior can be expected by both parties the subgame perfect Nash equilibrium may be a more meaningful solution concept when such dynamic inconsistencies arise.

== Proof of existence ==
=== Proof using the Kakutani fixed-point theorem ===
Nash's original proof (in his thesis) used Brouwer's fixed-point theorem (e.g., see below for a variant). This section presents a simpler proof via the Kakutani fixed-point theorem, following Nash's 1950 paper (he credits David Gale with the observation that such a simplification is possible).

To prove the existence of a Nash equilibrium, let $r_i(\sigma_{-i})$ be the best response of player i to the strategies of all other players.
$$r_i(\sigma_{-i}) = \mathop{\underset{\sigma_i}{\operatorname{arg\,max}}} u_i (\sigma_i,\sigma_{-i})$$

Here, $\sigma \in \Sigma$, where $\Sigma = \Sigma_i \times \Sigma_{-i}$, is a mixed-strategy profile in the set of all mixed strategies and $u_i$ is the payoff function for player i. Define a set-valued function $r\colon \Sigma \rightarrow 2^\Sigma$ such that $r = r_i(\sigma_{-i})\times r_{-i}(\sigma_{i})$. The existence of a Nash equilibrium is equivalent to $r$ having a fixed point.

Kakutani's fixed point theorem guarantees the existence of a fixed point if the following four conditions are satisfied.

1. $\Sigma$ is compact, convex, and nonempty.
2. $r(\sigma)$ is nonempty.
3. $r(\sigma)$ is upper hemicontinuous
4. $r(\sigma)$ is convex.

Condition 1. is satisfied from the fact that $\Sigma$ is a simplex and thus compact. Convexity follows from players' ability to mix strategies. $\Sigma$ is nonempty as long as players have strategies.

Condition 2. and 3. are satisfied by way of Berge's maximum theorem. Because $u_i$ is continuous and compact, $r(\sigma_i)$ is non-empty and upper hemicontinuous.

Condition 4. is satisfied as a result of mixed strategies. Suppose $\sigma_i, \sigma'_i \in r(\sigma_{-i})$, then $\lambda \sigma_i + (1-\lambda) \sigma'_i \in r(\sigma_{-i})$. i.e. if two strategies maximize payoffs, then a mix between the two strategies will yield the same payoff.

Therefore, there exists a fixed point in $r$ and a Nash equilibrium.

When Nash made this point to John von Neumann in 1949, von Neumann famously dismissed it with the words, "That's trivial, you know. That's just a fixed-point theorem." (See Nasar, 1998, p. 94.)

=== Alternate proof using the Brouwer fixed-point theorem ===
We have a game $G=(N,A,u)$ where $N$ is the number of players and $A = A_1 \times \cdots \times A_N$ is the action set for the players. All of the action sets $A_i$ are finite. Let $\Delta = \Delta_1 \times \cdots \times \Delta_N$ denote the set of mixed strategies for the players. The finiteness of the $A_i$s ensures the compactness of $\Delta$.

We can now define the gain functions. For a mixed strategy $\sigma \in \Delta$, we let the gain for player $i$ on action $a \in A_i$ be
$$\text{Gain}_i(\sigma,a) = \max \{0, u_i(a, \sigma_{-i}) - u_i(\sigma_{i}, \sigma_{-i})\}.$$

The gain function represents the benefit a player gets by unilaterally changing their strategy. We now define $g = (g_1,\dotsc,g_N)$ where
$$g_i(\sigma)(a) = \sigma_i(a) + \text{Gain}_i(\sigma,a)$$
for $\sigma \in \Delta, a \in A_i$. We see that
$$\sum_{a \in A_i} g_i(\sigma)(a) = \sum_{a \in A_i} \sigma_i(a) + \text{Gain}_i(\sigma,a) = 1 + \sum_{a \in A_i} \text{Gain}_i(\sigma,a) > 0.$$

Next we define:
$$\begin{cases} f = (f_1, \cdots, f_N)  : \Delta \to \Delta \\ f_i(\sigma)(a) = \frac{g_i(\sigma)(a)}{\sum_{b \in A_i} g_i(\sigma)(b)} & a \in A_i \end{cases}$$

It is easy to see that each $f_i$ is a valid mixed strategy in $\Delta_i$. It is also easy to check that each $f_i$ is a continuous function of $\sigma$, and hence $f$ is a continuous function. As the cross product of a finite number of compact convex sets, $\Delta$ is also compact and convex. Applying the Brouwer fixed point theorem to $f$ and $\Delta$ we conclude that $f$ has a fixed point in $\Delta$, call it $\sigma^*$. We claim that $\sigma^*$ is a Nash equilibrium in $G$. For this purpose, it suffices to show that
$$\forall i \in \{1, \cdots, N\}, \forall a \in A_i: \quad \text{Gain}_i(\sigma^*,a) = 0.$$

This simply states that each player gains no benefit by unilaterally changing their strategy, which is exactly the necessary condition for a Nash equilibrium.

Now assume that the gains are not all zero. Therefore, $\exists i \in \{1, \cdots, N\},$ and $a \in A_i$ such that $\text{Gain}_i(\sigma^*, a) > 0$. Then
$$\sum_{a \in A_i} g_i(\sigma^*, a) = 1 + \sum_{a \in A_i} \text{Gain}_i(\sigma^*,a) > 1.$$

So let
$$C = \sum_{a \in A_i} g_i(\sigma^*, a).$$

Also we shall denote $\text{Gain}(i,\cdot)$ as the gain vector indexed by actions in $A_i$. Since $\sigma^*$ is the fixed point we have:
$$\begin{align}
\sigma^* = f(\sigma^*)  &\Rightarrow  \sigma^*_i =  f_i(\sigma^*) \\
&\Rightarrow \sigma^*_i = \frac{g_i(\sigma^*)}{\sum_{a \in A_i} g_i(\sigma^*)(a)} \\ [6pt]
&\Rightarrow \sigma^*_i = \frac{1}{C} \left (\sigma^*_i + \text{Gain}_i(\sigma^*,\cdot) \right ) \\ [6pt]
&\Rightarrow C\sigma^*_i = \sigma^*_i + \text{Gain}_i(\sigma^*,\cdot) \\
&\Rightarrow \left(C-1\right)\sigma^*_i = \text{Gain}_i(\sigma^*,\cdot) \\
&\Rightarrow \sigma^*_i = \left(\frac{1}{C-1}\right)\text{Gain}_i(\sigma^*,\cdot).
\end{align}$$

Since $C > 1$ we have that $\sigma^*_i$ is some positive scaling of the vector $\text{Gain}_i(\sigma^*,\cdot)$. Now we claim that
$$\forall a \in A_i: \quad  \sigma^*_i(a)(u_i(a_i, \sigma^*_{-i}) - u_i(\sigma^*_i, \sigma^*_{-i})) = \sigma^*_i(a)\text{Gain}_i(\sigma^*, a)$$

To see this, first if $\text{Gain}_i(\sigma^*, a) > 0$ then this is true by definition of the gain function. Now assume that $\text{Gain}_i(\sigma^*, a) = 0$. By our previous statements we have that
$$\sigma^*_i(a) = \left(\frac{1}{C-1}\right)\text{Gain}_i(\sigma^*, a) = 0$$

and so the left term is zero, giving us that the entire expression is $0$ as needed.

So we finally have that
$$\begin{align}
0 &= u_i(\sigma^*_i, \sigma^*_{-i}) - u_i(\sigma^*_i, \sigma^*_{-i}) \\
&=  \left(\sum_{a \in A_i} \sigma^*_i(a)u_i(a_i, \sigma^*_{-i})\right) - u_i(\sigma^*_i, \sigma^*_{-i}) \\
& =  \sum_{a \in A_i} \sigma^*_i(a) (u_i(a_i, \sigma^*_{-i}) - u_i(\sigma^*_i, \sigma^*_{-i})) \\
& = \sum_{a \in A_i} \sigma^*_i(a) \text{Gain}_i(\sigma^*, a) && \text{ by the previous statements } \\
&= \sum_{a \in A_i} \left( C -1 \right) \sigma^*_i(a)^2 > 0
\end{align}$$

where the last inequality follows since $\sigma^*_i$ is a non-zero vector. But this is a clear contradiction, so all the gains must indeed be zero. Therefore, $\sigma^*$ is a Nash equilibrium for $G$ as needed.

== Computing Nash equilibria ==
If a player A has a dominant strategy $s_A$ then there exists a Nash equilibrium in which A plays $s_A$. In the case of two players A and B, there exists a Nash equilibrium in which A plays $s_A$ and B plays a best response to $s_A$. If $s_A$ is a strictly dominant strategy, A plays $s_A$ in all Nash equilibria. If both A and B have strictly dominant strategies, there exists a unique Nash equilibrium in which each plays their strictly dominant strategy.

In games with mixed-strategy Nash equilibria, the probability of a player choosing any particular (so pure) strategy can be computed by assigning a variable to each strategy that represents a fixed probability for choosing that strategy. In order for a player to be willing to randomize, their expected payoff for each (pure) strategy should be the same. In addition, the sum of the probabilities for each strategy of a particular player should be 1. This creates a system of equations from which the probabilities of choosing each strategy can be derived.

=== Examples ===
Matching pennies
Player A plays	Player B plays	
Player A plays	H	T
H	−1, +1	+1, −1
T	+1, −1	−1, +1

In the matching pennies game, player A loses a point to B if A and B play the same strategy and wins a point from B if they play different strategies. To compute the mixed-strategy Nash equilibrium, assign A the probability $p$ of playing H and $(1-p)$ of playing T, and assign B the probability $q$ of playing H and $(1-q)$ of playing T.

$$\begin{align}
&\mathbb{E}[\text{payoff for A playing H}] = (-1)q + (+1)(1 - q) = 1 - 2q, \\
&\mathbb{E}[\text{payoff for A playing T}] = (+1)q + (-1)(1 - q) = 2q - 1, \\
&\mathbb{E}[\text{payoff for A playing H}] = \mathbb{E}[\text{payoff for A playing T}] \implies 1 - 2q = 2q - 1 \implies q = \frac{1}{2}. \\
&\mathbb{E}[\text{payoff for B playing H}] = (+1)p + (-1)(1 - p) = 2p - 1, \\
&\mathbb{E}[\text{payoff for B playing T}] = (-1)p + (+1)(1 - p) = 1 - 2p, \\
&\mathbb{E}[\text{payoff for B playing H}] = \mathbb{E}[\text{payoff for B playing T}] \implies 2p - 1 = 1 - 2p \implies p = \frac{1}{2}.
\end{align}$$

Thus, a mixed-strategy Nash equilibrium in this game is for each player to randomly choose H or T with $p = \frac{1}{2}$ and $q = \frac{1}{2}$.

== Oddness of equilibrium points ==
Free money game
Player A votes	Player B votes	
Player A votes	Yes	No
Yes	1, 1	0, 0
No	0, 0	0, 0

In 1971, Robert Wilson came up with the "oddness theorem", which says that "almost all" finite games have a finite and odd number of Nash equilibria. In 1973, Harsanyi published an alternative proof of the result. "Almost all" here means that any game with an infinite or even number of equilibria is very special in the sense that if its payoffs were even slightly randomly perturbed, with probability one it would have an odd number of equilibria instead.

The prisoner's dilemma, for example, has one equilibrium, while the battle of the sexes has three—two pure and one mixed, and this remains true even if the payoffs change slightly. The free money game is an example of a "special" game with an even number of equilibria. In it, two players have to both vote "yes" rather than "no" to get a reward and the votes are simultaneous. There are two pure-strategy Nash equilibria, (yes, yes) and (no, no), and no mixed strategy equilibria, because the strategy "yes" weakly dominates "no". "Yes" is as good as "no" regardless of the other player's action, but if there is any chance the other player chooses "yes" then "yes" is the best reply. Under a small random perturbation of the payoffs, however, the probability that any two payoffs would remain tied, whether at 0 or some other number, is vanishingly small, and the game would have either one or three equilibria instead.

== Nash-solvability in Pure Strategies ==
In 1950 Nash proved that every $n$-person normal form game has a Nash equilibrium (NE) in mixed strategies. Yet, there are large families of games that have NE in pure strategies, for example, finite $n$-person positional (graphical) games with perfect information. In case of two players, Nash solvability in pure strategies is equivalent to duality of hypergraphs. For zero-sum games this was shown by J. Edmonds and D. R. Fulkerson. Later this result was extended for the non-zero sum case. Interestingly, in such NE the strategy of one player doesn't depend on the preferences of the other.

== Minmax acceptable profile ==
A strategy profile $s^*$ is called minmax-acceptable if the utility of each player in $s^*$ is at least the player's minmax value:

$$u_i(s^*) \geq \min_{s_{-i}}  \max_{s_i} u_i(s_{-i}, s_i)$$.

Every Nash equilibrium is minmax acceptable, as in a Nash equilibrium the following stronger property is satisfied:

$$u_i(s^*) = \max_{s_i} u_i(s^*_{-i}, s_i)$$.

But the opposite is not necessarily true. For example, consider the following two-player game, where only pure strategies are allowed:

	L	R
T	0,2	1,1
B	2,0	0,1

One can check all 4 pure-strategy profiles (the 4 cells in the matrix), and verify that in all of them, one of the players has a profitable deviation, so there is no Nash equilibrium. On the other hand, the minimax value of the row player is 1 (R-T) and the minimax value of the column player is 1 (B-R). Hence, the strategy profile R-T is minmax-acceptable.

There are games in which even a minmax-acceptable strategy profile does not exist. For example, in Matching pennies, the minimax values (with pure strategies) are 1,1, but the sum of payments is 0, so no strategy profile can give 1 to both players.

See also: Minimax theorem – Gives conditions that guarantee the max–min inequality holds with equality

== See also ==
- Equilibrium selection - explains how players choose one out of many possible Nash equilibria.
- M equilibrium - an adaptation of Nash equilibrium to boundedly-rational players.
- Manipulated Nash equilibrium - a relaxation of Nash equilibrium.
- Self-confirming equilibrium - another relaxation of Nash equilibrium.
- Extended Mathematical Programming § Equilibrium Problems

== Bibliography ==
=== Game theory textbooks ===
- Binmore, Ken (2007), Playing for Real: A Text on Game Theory, Oxford University Press, ISBN 978-0195300574.
- Dixit, Avinash, Susan Skeath and David Reiley. Games of Strategy. W.W. Norton & Company. (Third edition in 2009.) An undergraduate text.
- Dutta, Prajit K. (1999), Strategies and games: theory and practice, MIT Press, ISBN 978-0-262-04169-0. Suitable for undergraduate and business students.
- Fudenberg, Drew and Jean Tirole (1991) Game Theory MIT Press.
- Gibbons, Robert (1992), Game Theory for Applied Economists, Princeton University Press (July 13, 1992), ISBN 978-0-691-00395-5. Lucid and detailed introduction to game theory in an explicitly economic context.
- Morgenstern, Oskar and John von Neumann (1947) The Theory of Games and Economic Behavior Princeton University Press.
- Myerson, Roger B. (1997), Game Theory: Analysis of Conflict, Harvard University Press, ISBN 978-0-674-34116-6
- Osborne, Martin (2004), An Introduction to Game Theory, Oxford University Press, ISBN 978-0-19-512895-6.
- Papayoanou, Paul (2010), Game Theory for Business: A Primer in Strategic Gaming, Probabilistic Publishing, ISBN 978-0964793873
- Rubinstein, Ariel; Osborne, Martin J. (1994), A Course in Game Theory, MIT Press, ISBN 978-0-262-65040-3. A modern introduction at the graduate level.
- Shoham, Yoav; Leyton-Brown, Kevin (2009), Multiagent Systems: Algorithmic, Game-Theoretic, and Logical Foundations, New York: Cambridge University Press, ISBN 978-0-521-89943-7. A comprehensive reference from a computational perspective; see Chapter 3. Downloadable free online.

=== Original Nash papers ===
- Nash, John (1950) "Equilibrium points in n-person games" Proceedings of the National Academy of Sciences 36(1):48-49.
- Nash, John (1951) "Non-Cooperative Games" The Annals of Mathematics 54(2):286-295.

=== Other references ===
- Mehlmann, A. (2000) The Game's Afoot! Game Theory in Myth and Paradox, American Mathematical Society.
- Nasar, Sylvia (1998), A Beautiful Mind, Simon & Schuster.
- Aviad Rubinstein: "Hardness of Approximation Between P and NP", ACM, ISBN 978-1-947487-23-9 (May 2019), DOI: https://doi.org/10.1145/3241304 . # Explains the Nash Equilibrium is a hard problem in computation.
