= Subgame perfect equilibrium =

Game theory concept

Subgame Perfect Equilibrium
- Solution concept in game theory

Relationship
- Subset of: Nash equilibrium
- Intersects with: Evolutionarily stable strategy

Significance
- Proposed by: Reinhard Selten (1965)
- Used for: Extensive form games
- Example: Ultimatum game

In game theory, a subgame perfect equilibrium (SPE), or subgame perfect Nash equilibrium (SPNE), is a refinement of the Nash equilibrium concept, specifically designed for dynamic games where players make sequential decisions. A strategy profile is an SPE if it represents a Nash equilibrium in every possible subgame of the original game. Informally, this means that at any point in the game, the players' behavior from that point onward should represent a Nash equilibrium of the continuation game (i.e. of the subgame), no matter what happened before. This ensures that strategies are credible and rational throughout the entire game, eliminating non-credible threats.

Every finite extensive game with complete information (all players know the complete state of the game) and perfect recall (each player remembers all their previous actions and knowledge throughout the game) has a subgame perfect equilibrium. A common method for finding SPE in finite games is backward induction, where one starts by analyzing the last actions the final mover should take to maximize his/her utility and works backward. While backward induction is a common method for finding SPE in finite games, it is not always applicable to games with infinite horizons, or those with imperfect or incomplete information. In infinite horizon games, other techniques, like the one-shot deviation principle, are often used to verify SPE.

Subgame perfect equilibrium necessarily satisfies the one-shot deviation principle and is always a subset of the Nash equilibria for a given game. The ultimatum game is a classic example of a game with fewer subgame perfect equilibria than Nash equilibria.

== Example ==
Determining the subgame perfect equilibrium by using backward induction is shown below in Figure 1. Strategies for Player 1 are given by {Up, Uq, Dp, Dq}, whereas Player 2 has the strategies among {TL, TR, BL, BR}. There are 4 subgames in this example, with 3 proper subgames.

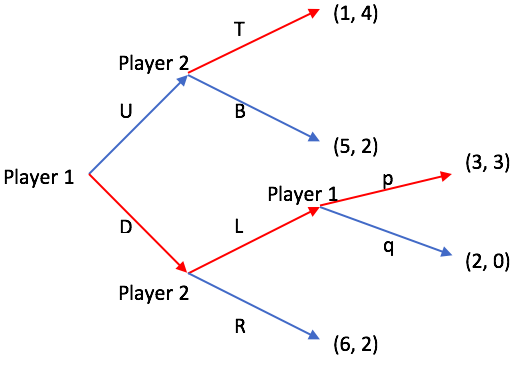
Figure 1

Using the backward induction, the players will take the following actions for each subgame:

- Subgame for actions p and q: Player 1 will take action p with payoff (3, 3) to maximize Player 1's payoff, so the payoff for action L becomes (3,3).
- Subgame for actions L and R: Player 2 will take action L for 3 > 2, so the payoff for action D becomes (3, 3).
- Subgame for actions T and B: Player 2 will take action T to maximize Player 2's payoff, so the payoff for action U becomes (1, 4).
- Subgame for actions U and D: Player 1 will take action D to maximize Player 1's payoff.

Thus, the subgame perfect equilibrium is {Dp, TL} with the payoff (3, 3).

An extensive-form game with incomplete information is presented below in Figure 2. Note that the node for Player 1 with actions A and B, and all succeeding actions is a subgame. Player 2's nodes are not a subgame as they are part of the same information set.

Figure 2

The first normal-form game is the normal form representation of the whole extensive-form game. Based on the provided information, (UA, X), (DA, Y), and (DB, Y) are all Nash equilibria for the entire game.

The second normal-form game is the normal form representation of the subgame starting from Player 1's second node with actions A and B. For the second normal-form game, the Nash equilibrium of the subgame is (A, X).

For the entire game Nash equilibria (DA, Y) and (DB, Y) are not subgame perfect equilibria because the move of Player 2 does not constitute a Nash equilibrium. The Nash equilibrium (UA, X) is subgame perfect because it incorporates the subgame Nash equilibrium (A, X) as part of its strategy.

To solve this game, first find the Nash equilibria by mutual best response of Subgame 1. Then use backwards induction and plug in (A,X) → (3,4) so that (3,4) become the payoffs for Subgame 2.

The dashed line indicates that player 2 does not know whether player 1 will play A or B in a simultaneous game.

Subgame 1 is solved and (3,4) replaces all of Subgame 1 and player one will choose U -> (3,4)Solution for Subgame 1

Player 1 chooses U rather than D because 3 > 2 for Player 1's payoff. The resulting equilibrium is (A, X) → (3,4).

Solution of Subgame Perfect Equilibrium

Thus, the subgame perfect equilibrium through backwards induction is (UA, X) with the payoff (3, 4).

== Repeated games ==
For finitely repeated games, if a stage game has only one unique Nash equilibrium, the subgame perfect equilibrium is to play without considering past actions, treating the current subgame as a one-shot game. An example of this is a finitely repeated Prisoner's dilemma game. The Prisoner's dilemma gets its name from a situation that contains two guilty culprits. When they are interrogated, they have the option to stay quiet or defect. If both culprits stay quiet, they both serve a short sentence. If both defect, they both serve a moderate sentence. If they choose opposite options, then the culprit that defects is free and the culprit who stays quiet serves a long sentence. Ultimately, using backward induction, the last subgame in a finitely repeated Prisoner's dilemma requires players to play the unique Nash equilibrium (both players defecting). Because of this, all games prior to the last subgame will also play the Nash equilibrium to maximize their single-period payoffs. If a stage-game in a finitely repeated game has multiple Nash equilibria, subgame perfect equilibria can be constructed to play non-stage-game Nash equilibrium actions, through a "carrot and stick" structure. One player can use the one stage-game Nash equilibrium to incentivize playing the non-Nash equilibrium action, while using a stage-game Nash equilibrium with lower payoff to the other player if they choose to defect.

== Finding subgame-perfect equilibria ==
One game in which the backward induction solution is well known is tic-tac-toe

Reinhard Selten proved that any game which can be broken into "sub-games" containing a sub-set of all the available choices in the main game will have a subgame perfect Nash Equilibrium strategy (possibly as a mixed strategy giving non-deterministic sub-game decisions). Subgame perfection is only used with games of complete information. Subgame perfection can be used with extensive form games of complete but imperfect information.

The subgame-perfect Nash equilibrium is normally deduced by "backward induction" from the various ultimate outcomes of the game, eliminating branches which would involve any player making a move that is not credible (because it is not optimal) from that node. One game in which the backward induction solution is well known is tic-tac-toe, but in theory even Go has such an optimum strategy for all players. The problem of the relationship between subgame perfection and backward induction was settled by Kaminski (2019), who proved that a generalized procedure of backward induction produces all subgame perfect equilibria in games that may have infinite length, infinite actions as each information set, and imperfect information if a condition of final support is satisfied.

The interesting aspect of the word "credible" in the preceding paragraph is that taken as a whole (disregarding the irreversibility of reaching sub-games) strategies exist which are superior to subgame perfect strategies, but which are not credible in the sense that a threat to carry them out will harm the player making the threat and prevent that combination of strategies. For instance in the game of "chicken" if one player has the option of ripping the steering wheel from their car they should always take it because it leads to a "sub game" in which their rational opponent is precluded from doing the same thing (and killing them both). The wheel-ripper will always win the game (making his opponent swerve away), and the opponent's threat to suicidally follow suit is not credible.

== See also ==
- Centipede game
- Dynamic inconsistency
- Glossary of game theory
- Minimax theorem
- Retrograde analysis
- Solution concept
- Bellman's principle of optimality
