= Sequential game =

Class of games where players choose their actions sequentially

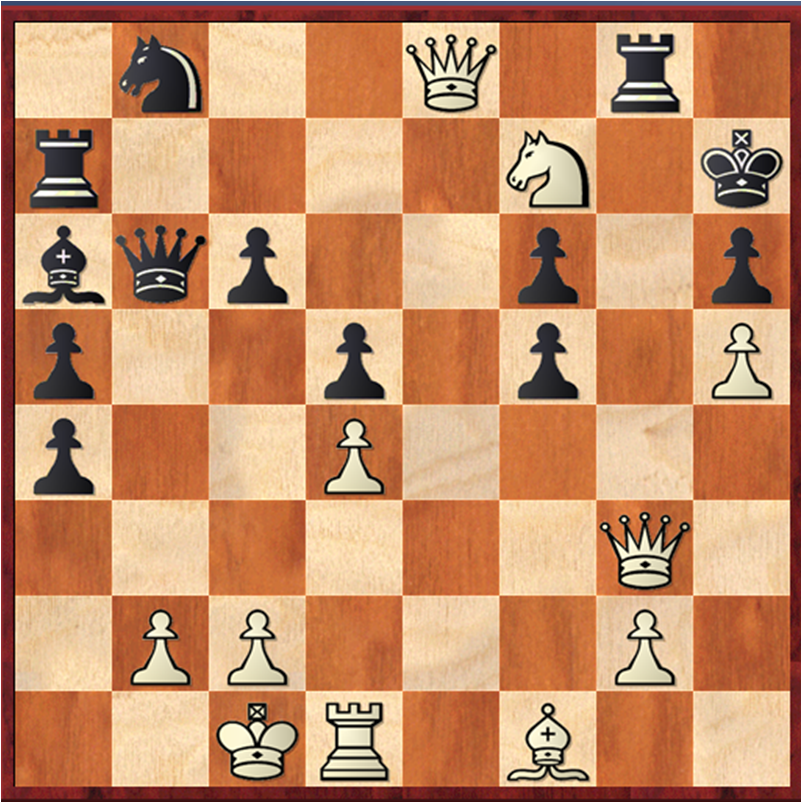
Chess is an example of a sequential game.

In game theory, a sequential game is defined as a game where one player selects their action before others, and subsequent players are informed of that choice before making their own decisions. This turn-based structure, governed by a time axis, distinguishes sequential games from simultaneous games, where players act without knowledge of others’ choices and outcomes are depicted in payoff matrices (e.g., rock-paper-scissors).

Sequential games are a type of dynamic game, a broader category where decisions occur over time (e.g., differential games), but they specifically emphasize a clear order of moves with known prior actions. Because later players know what earlier players did, the order of moves shapes strategy through information rather than timing alone. Sequential games are typically represented using decision trees, which map out all possible sequences of play, unlike the static matrices of simultaneous games. Examples include chess, infinite chess, backgammon, tic-tac-toe, and Go, with decision trees varying in complexity—from the compact tree of tic-tac-toe to the vast, unmappable tree of chess.

== Representation and analysis ==
Decision trees, the extensive form of sequential games, provide a detailed framework for understanding how a game unfolds. They outline the order of players’ actions, the frequency of decisions, and the information available at each decision point, with payoffs assigned to terminal nodes. This representation was introduced by John von Neumann and refined by Harold W. Kuhn between 1910 and 1930.

Sequential games with perfect information—where all prior moves are known—can be analyzed using combinatorial game theory, a mathematical approach to strategic decision-making. In such games, a subgame perfect equilibrium can be determined through backward induction, a process of working from the end of the game back to the start to identify optimal strategies.

Games can also be categorized by their outcomes: a game is strictly determined if rational players arrive at one clear payoff using fixed, non-random strategies (known as "pure strategies"), or simply determined if the single rational payoff requires players to mix their choices randomly (using "mixed strategies").

== Types and dynamics ==
Sequential games encompass various forms, including repeated games, where players engage in a series of stage games, and each stage’s outcome shapes the next. In repeated games, players have full knowledge of prior stages, and a discount rate (between 0 and 1) is often applied to assess long-term payoffs, reflecting the reduced value of future gains. This structure introduces psychological dimensions like trust and revenge, as players adjust their strategies based on past interactions. In contrast, simultaneous games lack this sequential progression, relying instead on concurrent moves and payoff matrices.

Many combinatorial games, such as chess or Go, align with the sequential model due to their turn-based nature. The complexity of these games varies widely: a simple game like tic-tac-toe has a manageable decision tree, while chess’s tree is so expansive that even modern computers cannot fully explore it. These examples illustrate how sequential games blend strategic depth with temporal dynamics.

== See also ==
- Simultaneous game
- Subgame perfect equilibrium
- Sequential auction
