= Hand game =

Game played using the hands

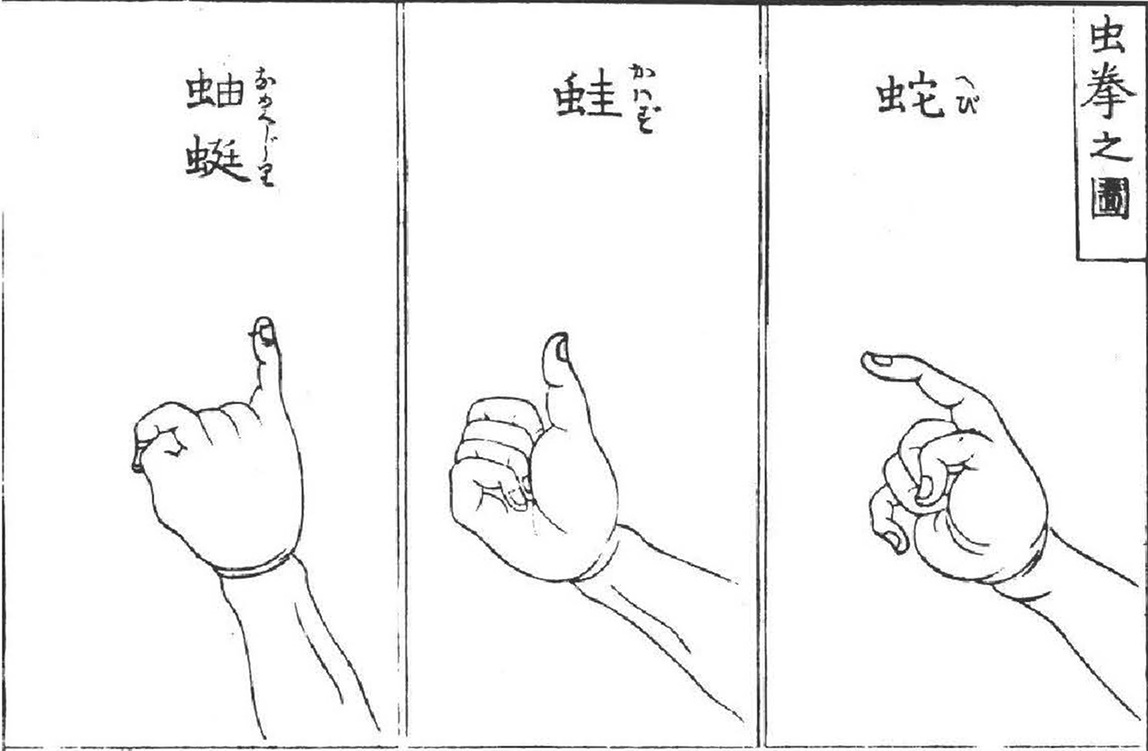
Mushi-ken, a Japanese hand game (1809)

Hand games are games played using only the hands of the players. Hand games exist in a variety of cultures internationally, and are of interest to academic studies in ethnomusicology and music education. Hand games are used to teach music literacy skills and socio-emotional learning in elementary music classrooms internationally.

== History ==
Hand games are among forms of play dating to ancient times. Slahal is an ancient bluffing game in which teams try to identify marked deer bones hidden in players' hands. Indigenous hand-game traditions such as an element of the Ghost Dance may have ritual importance or revert to just being games.

Simple hand-clapping games have a long history in Europe, with Pat-a-cake recorded as early as 1698.

== Education ==
Hand-clapping games can provide time for children to play with traditional songs. Music educators may use hand-clapping to help students feel pulse and rhythm.

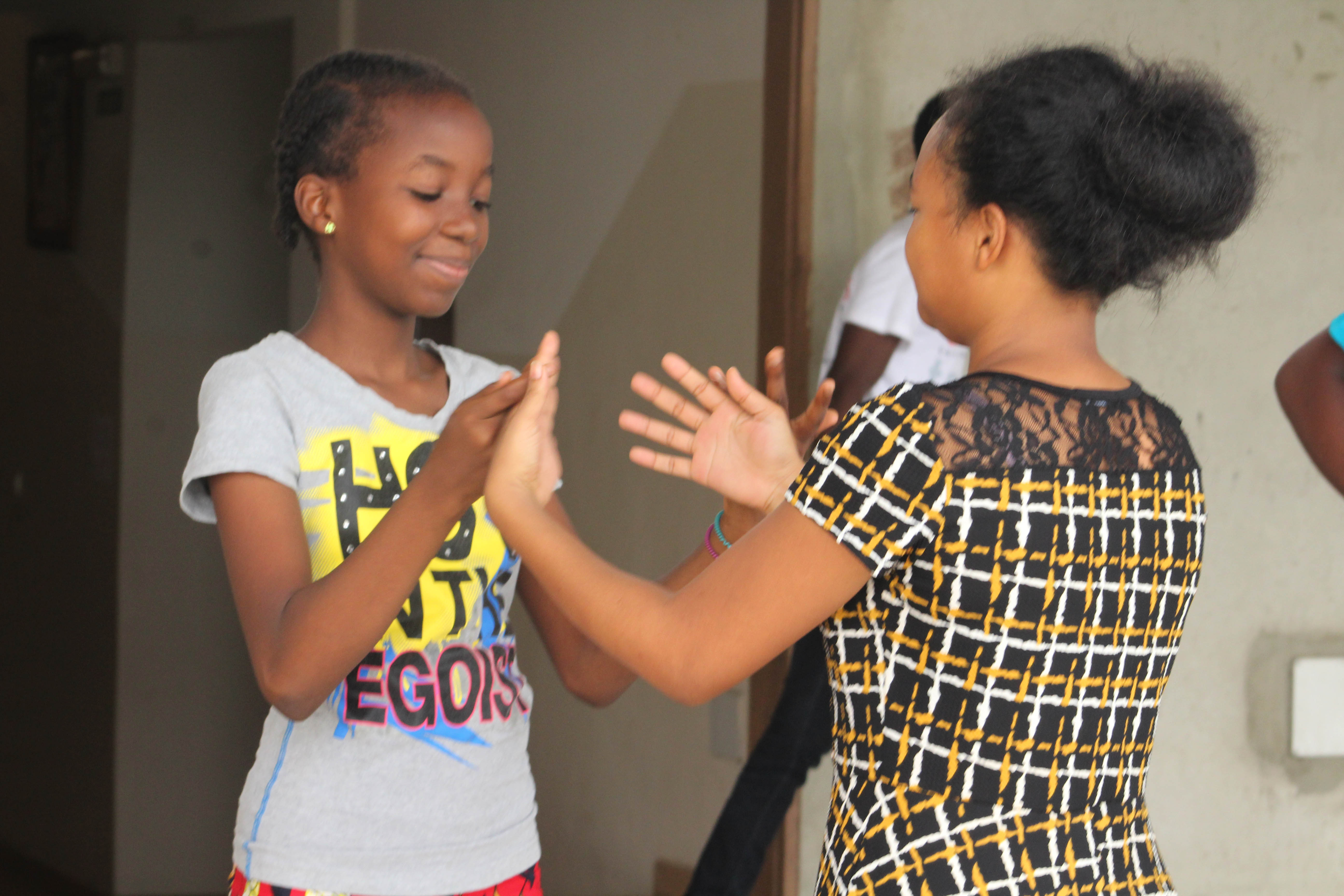
Girls playing clapping games in Benin.

Research shows that finger counting games and activities support children’s learning by teaching early mathematics concepts. Fingers have the advantage of being easily countable items that are almost always available. Pairing hand gestures with speech helps them understand numbers, counting order, the base-10 numeral system, and addition.

Finger counting games provide a "sensory-motor experience that helps build abstract thinking skills." In addition to counting, they help in the understanding of one-to-one correspondence, cardinality and subitizing.

Finger counting games also aid children who struggle with dyscalculia by engaging their senses.

== Examples of hand games ==
- Arm wrestling
- Bloody knuckles
- Chopsticks (sticks)
- The circle game
- Clapping games (Pat-a-cake and variations like Mary Mack)
- Fingerhakeln
- Give, Granny, Fire!
- Hand cricket
- Mercy
- Morra (finger counting)
- Odds and evens
- Red hands (or hand-slap game)
- Rock paper scissors
- Sansukumi-ken
  - Kitsune-ken
  - Mushi-ken
  - Yakyūken
- Thumb war (or thumb wrestling)
- "Where are your keys?" (language acquisition game)

Less strictly, the following may be considered hand games:

- Fingers (drinking game, but debatable since game can be played without the drink)
- Jacks (uses jacks)
- Knife game (uses knife)
- Spellbinder (uses paper and pencil)
- Stick gambling (uses a stick)
- String games, such as cat's cradle

== See also ==
- Fingerboarding
- Fingerplay
- Hand jive
- Hand Shadows
- Thumb twiddling
