= Odds and evens (hand game) =

Game of chance and hand game

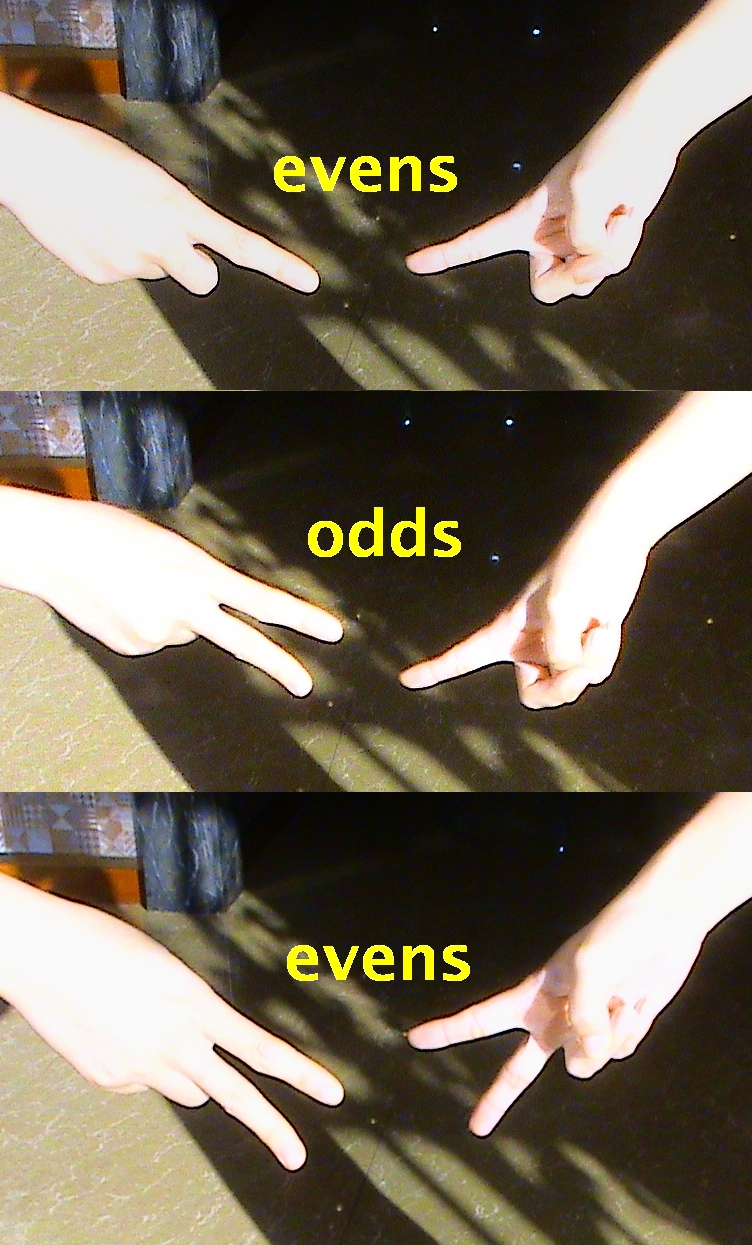
- Three rounds of the game, showing two, three and four fingers.
- Genres: Hand game
- Players: 2
- Setup time: None
- Playing time: Instant
- Chance: Completely
- Skills: Psychology

Odds and evens is a simple game of chance and hand game, involving two people simultaneously revealing a number of fingers and winning or losing depending on whether they are odd or even, or alternatively involving one person picking up coins or other small objects and hiding them in their closed hand, while another player guesses whether they have an odd or even number. The game may be used to make a decision or played for fun.

The finger game is also known as swords, choosies, pick, odds-on poke, or bucking up. This zero-sum game, a variation of the ancient morra and par-impar, is played in Europe, the US, and in Brazil, especially among children.

== History ==
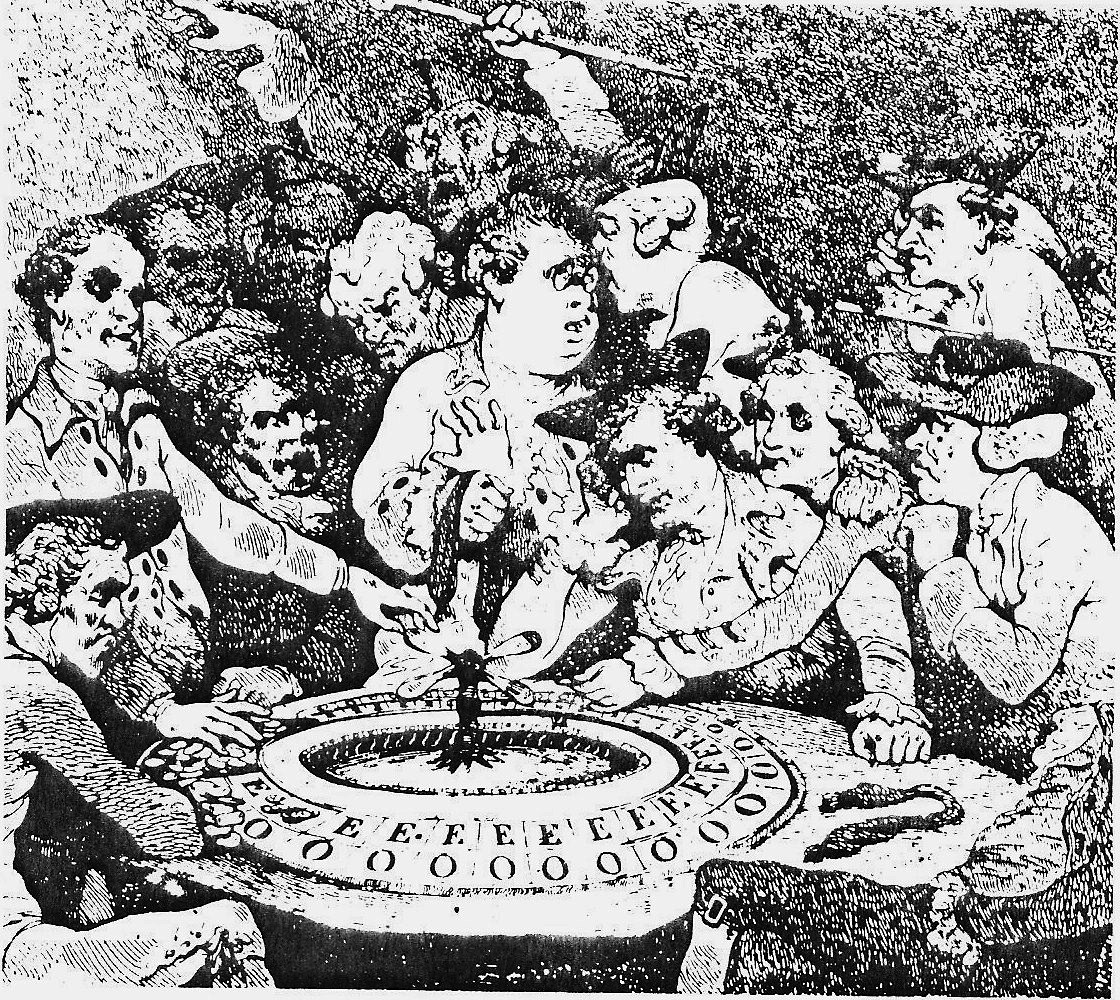
Even-Odd as an early form of roulette

This game was known by the Greeks (as artiazein) and Romans (as ludere par impar). In the 1858 Krünitzlexikon it says: "The game Odds and Evens was very common amongst the Romans and was played either with tali, tesseris, or money and known as "Alea maior", or with nuts, beans and almonds and known as "Alea minor"."

A medieval reference is found in the Renner by Hugo von Trimberg (verse 2695).

Odds and Evens (Gerade und Ungerade) is included in the list of games prohibited in Austria-Hungary in 1904 by the Ministry of Justice.

== Playing ==
The game has similarities with the finger game of Morra or Fingerlosen (one person hides their hand and then quickly folds or extends one's fingers and the other player has to guess how many fingers are folded or extended).

In Odds and Evens, however, individuals prepare by deciding who will be assigned odds and who will be evens. Then, one or both people say "One, two, three, shoot!" or "once, twice, three, shoot!" As the word "shoot" is said, the two people quickly and simultaneously thrust a fist into the center, extending either an index finger, or both the middle and index finger, indicating one or two. The sum total of fingers displayed is either odd or even. If the result is odd, then the person who called odds is the victor, and can decide the issue as they see fit. Often, the participants continue to shoot for a best two out of three.

From a game-theoretic perspective, the game is equivalent to matching pennies. See that article for analysis of the strategies and chances of winning.

== Adaption ==
The name Even-Odd or EO (Gerade und Ungerade) was even given to a predecessor of roulette in the 18th century. This continues today in modern roulette in the bets on Pair and Impair.

== See also ==
- Chetno i likho – a game of chance where the players have to guess if the hidden objects are even or odd.
- Coin flipping – a method of making a yes-or-no decision at random.
- Drawing straws – a method of making a group decision - choosing one member of the group.
- Matching pennies – a game of chance with a similar strategic structure, using coins instead of fingers.
- Parity game – an unrelated (and much more complicated) two-player logic game, played on a colored graph.
- Rock paper scissors – a game where each player has three alternatives instead of two.
