= Cetno i licho =

Polish game of chance

Cetno i licho is a simple game of chance, of ancient European provenance (see par-impar), where the players had to guess if the hidden objects were even (czetno, cetno, cet or čet) or odd (licho, see likho, or liszka) in number, with licho also meaning 'bad luck' or 'devil'. The counted objects could also be white or black pawns or lines drawn in ashes, and the game had mystical overtones of invoking the Sudice, the Slavic counterpart of the Fates (compare the Old English term wyrd).

== See also ==
- Morra (game)
- Odds and evens (hand game)

== In literature ==
Cetno i licho: literary essays by Żółkiewski

Cet czy Licho, Józef Ignacy Kraszewski
