= Horsengoggle =

Horsengoggle (also known as horse-and-goggle and horse 'n' goggle and hossengoggle) is a method of selecting a random person from a group. Unlike some other methods, such as rock paper scissors, one of the features of horsengoggle is that there is always a winner; it is impossible to tie.

To use the system, all participants stand in a circle. An arbitrary member of the group is selected by the leader as a starting point. All participants simultaneously show between zero and five fingers. The leader counts the total number of fingers shown, then counts that many people around the circle. The selected person is the winner.

In his memoir of growing up in Missouri in the 1940s, Jim Frank mentions the game as "ein [sic], zwei, drei, horsengoggle", which he describes as "an old German system of selection". Horsengoggle is used by a number of youth camps in the United States, and by some Girl Scout units.

== Fairness ==
Even though the game always results in a winner, Horsengoggle is not always completely fair unless the starting point is selected totally at random. If this is not the case, the game is only fair when played with six participants, or if participants show between zero and m-1 fingers where m is a multiple of n, the number of participants. However, the difference in probability between the participants is approximately one or two percent for any reasonable n. We can prove the fairness assertion as follows:

In order to more simply translate Horsengoggle to dice rolls, we can treat the problem as if the players are choosing between one and six fingers. This will not alter the probability distribution because we can obtain the zero to five distribution by subtracting n from the result of each one to six result. Since this alters each result equally, an equal and fair distribution will remain fair and an unfair distribution will remain unfair.

We are also to assume that every player selects their number with equal probability. If every player is employing optimal strategy to win, showing bias towards any number would only allow opponents to take advantage of that unequal distribution. Therefore, the optimal strategy is to act perfectly randomly.

As a result, we can translate the game of Horsengoggle to one roll of n dice. In the case of n = 2, the set of all possible dice sums can be expressed in the table below:

	Roll a 1	Roll a 2	Roll a 3	Roll a 4	Roll a 5	Roll a 6
Roll a 1	2	3	4	5	6	7
Roll a 2	3	4	5	6	7	8
Roll a 3	4	5	6	7	8	9
Roll a 4	5	6	7	8	9	10
Roll a 5	6	7	8	9	10	11
Roll a 6	7	8	9	10	11	12

If we begin counting with the starting point being zero, all even totals will result in the starting point as the winner and all odd totals will result in the other player as the winner. With each cell in the above table having an equal probability of occurring, we can compare the number of even entries to the number of odd entries. In this case they are both equal to 18 and thus Horsengoggle is fair with two players. This is consistent with the claim because m-1 = 5 (# of fingers), so m = 6, which is indeed a multiple of n, which is 2.

To show why the claim is true, we must transfer our dice problem into a more general distribution of n m-sided dice being rolled. This can be done by constructing a more generalized version of Pascal's triangle that remains 2-dimensional, unlike Pascal's simplex, whose rows are the multinomial coefficients of the nth multinomial series expansion.

When m = 2, the problem will be equivalent to rolling two-sided dice, or coins, and constructing a binomial triangle (also known as Pascal's triangle). When m = 3, we will construct a trinomial triangle, when m = 4, a quadrinomial, etc. When n = 2 we will be considering the numbers on the second row, when n = 3, the third row, etc. The combinatoric properties of the multinomial triangles is what lends its connection to dice rolls, but a more formal explanation can be arrived by proving dice rolls are equivalent multinomial expansions, which are in turn equivalent to the rows of the multinomial triangle.

We can now put the previous example into new light by constructing the multinomial triangle of dimension 6 and examining the 2nd row ("1st" row is considered 0th zero).

0		0		0		0		0		1		0		0		0		0		0
	0		0		1		1		1		1		1		1		0		0
1		2		3		4		5		6		5		4		3		2		1

Every term in the multinomial triangle of dimension six is the sum of the nearest 6 terms above (similarly every term in Pascal's triangle is the sum of the two terms above). As we did earlier, we can take every other term in the 2nd row and sum to produce 18 starting on both the first and second terms.

To construct a more general proof we first set set n = m. However, for simplicity's sake, we will still examine the second row of the 6-nomial triangle and show that this property holds true for all rows, including the 6th row. We also can replace the numbers in the first row with a, b, c, d, e, and f and compute the terms of the second row that follow.

0		0		0		0		0		1		0		0		0		0		0
	0		0		a		b		c		d		e		f		0		0
a		a+b		a+b+c		a+b+c+d		a+b+c+d+e		a+b+c+d+e+f		b+c+d+e+f		c+d+e+f		d+e+f		e+f		f

If we sum every 6th term of the second row, we find that in every case it is equal to a+b+c+d+e+f. Since every term is the sum of the six above it and the terms we are concerned with are six apart, there is no overlap. It is not difficult to see this holds true for every row of the 6-nomial triangle (we are interested in the nth row specifically) and m-nomial triangles as well.

We can calculate the sum of every 2nd term in the 2nd row of the 6-nomial triangle as well. It turns out to be 3*(a+b+c+d+e+f) in both cases, which is consistent with our previous finding (18=3*(1+1+1+1+1+1)). This is because the sum of every 2nd term can be broken down into 3 sums of every 6th term. This can only be done if n is a divisor of m (and m is a multiple of n).

== See also ==
- Morra (game) of which this is a multiplayer variant.
