= Yakyūken =

Japanese game based on rock–paper–scissors

Yakyūken (野球拳; lit. 'baseball fist') is a Japanese game based on rock–paper–scissors. Three players compete. The host cries out "Play ball". The contestants dance to music played on the shamisen and taiko. The host chants "Runner ni nattara essassa." ("Hope the batter gets to run"). The crowd cries out "Out! Safe! Yoyonoyoi", as the three contestants show a fist, and then "Jankenpon" as they reveal the gesture they chose. Once the winner is clear, the crowd cries out "Hebo noke Hebo noke. Okawari koi" ("Losers leave, and newcomers come"). If there is a tie that needs breaking, the players shout "Aiko de bon!" ("Tie, so again!"). By the late 1950s, it became common for the loser to have to remove an item of clothing.

Yakyūken gets its name from a Shikoku chant which is still a local performance art today. It is quite common to see yakyūken on Japanese television variety shows especially at New Years.

== Origin ==
The game of strip rock-paper-scissors is mentioned in Kasshiyawa (甲子夜話), a Japanese collection of essays first put out in 1719.

The term 'yakyūken' originated from a Shikoku baseball game in October 1924, between the local teams of Ehime and Kagawa. The Ehime team lost the game 6–0, and its manager, senryū poet Goken Maeda (前田伍健), improvised a cheerleading dance from the tune of classical kabuki Botan ni Chōougi no irodori (牡丹蝶扇彩) to boost the morale of his humiliated team. This dance later became an iconic feature of the Ehime team.

In 1954, singers like Ichiro Wakahara (若原一郎) and Terukiku (照菊) from King, Yukie Satoshi (久保幸江) and Kubo Takakura (高倉敏) from Nippon Columbia, and Harumi Aoki (青木はるみ) from Victor Japan each adapted the dance and its lyrics into record singles named "Yakyuken" (lit. "baseball fist"), and the term quickly became known nationwide. In 1966, the city of Matsuyama, where the cheerleading dance originated, introduced it as a representative taiko dance for Matsuyama in Shikoku's annual August banquet. In 1970, the banquet dance was transformed into the more popular sansukumi-ken parlour game that continued to today, which the Matsuyama people regarded as honke (lit. "senior branch" or "orthodox") yakyūken.

In 1969, Nippon TV introduced a skit as part of its hugely popular owarai variety show Conte #55's Counterprogram Strikes! (コント55号の裏番組をぶっとばせ!) by comedians Kinichi Hagimoto and Jirō Sakagami, where beautiful female guests were invited to play sansukumi-ken on stage, and the loser would undress and auction off her clothes to the studio audience for charity. This skit was successful enough in terms of ratings that later in the year it became its own separate show called Conte #55's Yakyuken!! (コント55号の野球ケン!!), named such as Hagimoto was a keen baseball fan. Yakyūken came to associated with strip games. Because of this, Hagimoto himself personally visited Matsuyama in 2005 and apologized to Tsuyoshitoshi Sawada (澤田剛年), the fourth-generation iemoto of honke yakyūken, for unintentionally distorting yakyūken.

Yakyūken eroge are also popular in Japan and many East Asian countries, with the first yakyūken video game being created by Hudson Soft for the Sharp MZ-80K in 1981. Yakyūken as a stripping game was further propagated by the prolific Japanese adult video industry, which often used the yakyūken chant in their videos.
