= Sansukumi-ken =

Category of East Asian hand games

Sansukumi-ken (三すくみ拳, from 三すくみ sansukumi "three-way deadlock" and 拳 ken "hand game") is a category of East Asian ken games (hand games) played by using three hand gestures. Ken games went into a period of decline in Japan after World War II. One of the few surviving sansukumi-ken games is jan-ken, which was brought to the West in the 20th century as rock paper scissors.

== History ==
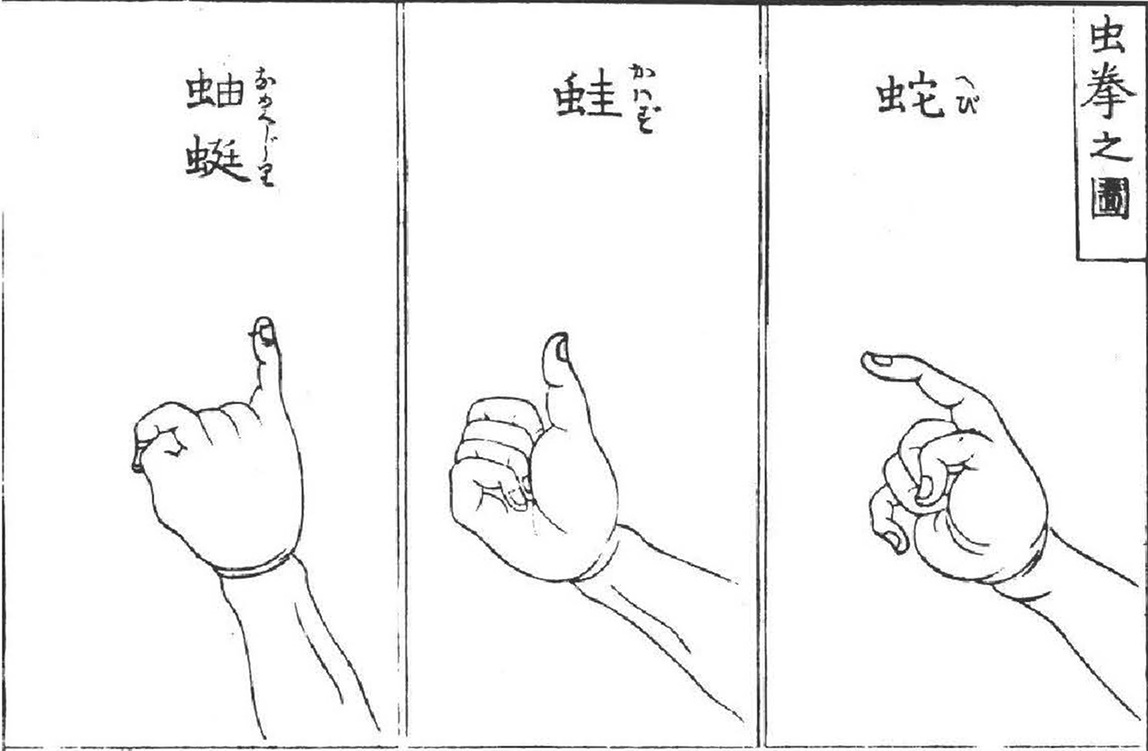
Mushi-ken, the earliest Japanese sansukumi-ken game (1809). From left to right: slug (Namekuji), frog (Kawazu), and snake (Hebi).

East Asia has a long history of hand games, which are known as ken games in Japan. Ken was brought to Japan in the 17th century as a Chinese drinking game. Aside from drinking, ken games were also popular in brothels as a form of foreplay. The earliest Japanese ken games are called Nagasaki-ken or Kiyo-ken because of the belief that ken games were first popularized by the Chinese community in Nagasaki. Kensarae sumai zue, an 1809 handbook for ken games, contains a speech read by ken tournament referees that summarizes the history of ken. The speech chronicles ken as a game played by the emperors of ancient China during drinking parties. It recounts a traditional story about the origin of ken in Japan. The story is set in Nagasaki's Maruyama red light district approximately 150 years prior to the publication of the handbook. The Chinese hosted a party in Maruyama and held Japan's first ken tournament after feasting and dancing. The party guests competed until five of the best ken players were selected and awarded expensive prizes. The importance of the party is never made clear in the speech, but the story is useful for understanding the cultural background of ken games.

Ken games played with three hand gestures became popular in the 18th century. They were named sansukumi-ken, which translates into "ken of the three who are afraid of one another." The oldest sansukumi-ken game is mushi-ken (虫拳), a game originally from China. In mushi-ken, the "frog" represented by the thumb wins against the "slug" represented by the pinkie finger, which, in turn defeats the "snake" (蛇) represented by the index finger, which wins against the "frog" (蛙). Although this game was imported from China, the Japanese version differs in the animals represented: in the Chinese version, the centipede takes the place of the slug, because of the Chinese belief that the centipede was capable of killing a snake by climbing and entering its head. When the game was adopted by the Japanese, the original Chinese characters for centipede or millipede (蚰蜒) were apparently confused with the characters for the "slug" (蛞蝓).

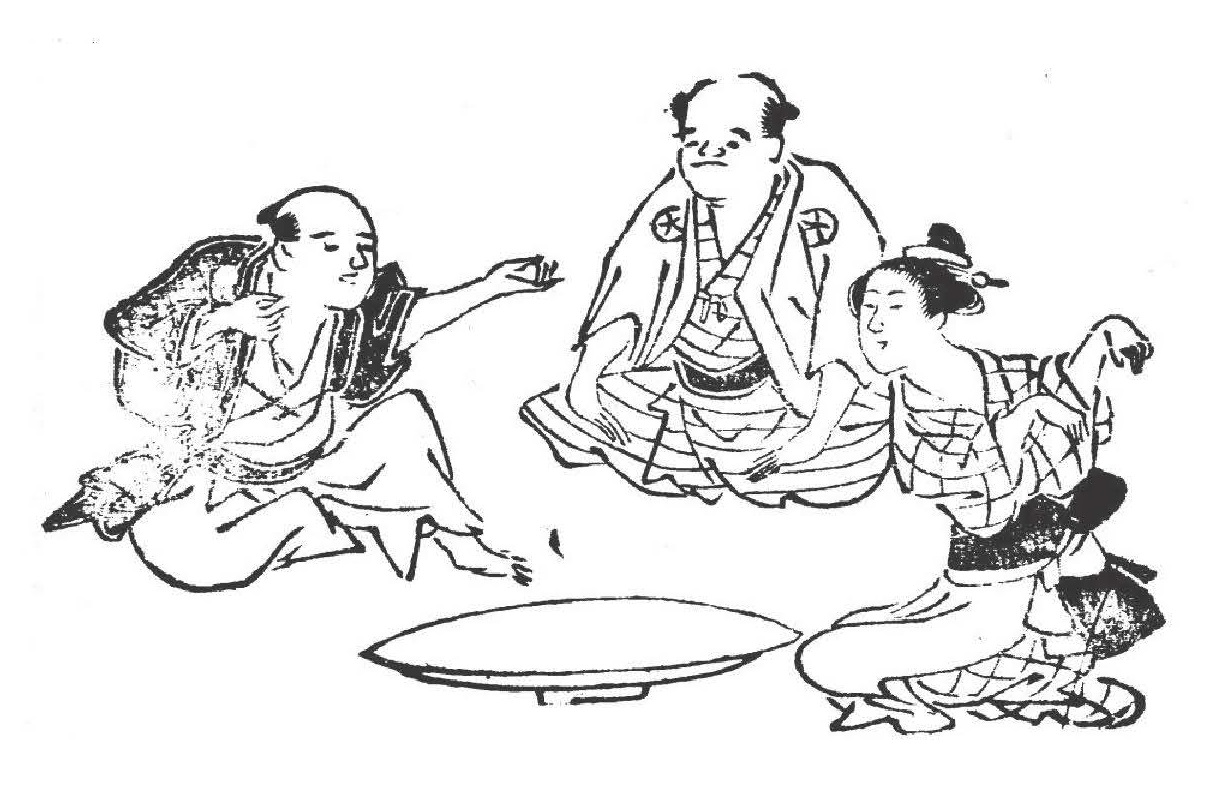
Kitsune-ken (or tōhachi-ken), another Japanese sansukumi-ken game (1774). From left to right: Hunter (Ryōshi), village head (Shōya), and fox (Kitsune).

The most popular sansukumi-ken game in Japan was kitsune-ken (狐拳), also known as tōhachiken (東八拳). In the game, a supernatural fox called a kitsune (狐) defeats the village head, the village head (庄屋) defeats the hunter, and the hunter (猟師) defeats the fox. A distinct feature of kitsune-ken is that the game is played by making gestures with both hands. To gesture the village head, the player would place their hands on their legs; for the hunter, the player would hold an imaginary rifle; and for the fox, the player would hold their hands up, palms towards the other player. The chonkina stripping game is a variation of kitsune-ken where players remove their clothing each time they lose a round.

=== Modern versions ===
Ken games underwent a transformation from drinking games played by adults into children's games. Several Japanese writers made note of the observation that children were playing a game once associated with brothels. In the year 1810, the author of the essay "Asugakawa" admonished children for playing hand games, saying: "In former days children used to play red-shell-horse-riding or they fought with the shell of mussels. Of today's children nobody knows these games. The games which children play when they come together are 'The old man goes to the mountain to cut wood, while the old woman goes to the river to wash' like in former times, but now they play also mushi-ken, fox-ken, and original ken. How funny!"

Rock paper scissors is one of the few sansukumi-ken games still played in modern Japan. It is uncertain why rock paper scissors managed to surpass the popularity of all other sansukumi-ken games. Linhart believes that the global success of rock paper scissors comes from the universal appeal of its simplicity. Unlike other sansukumi-ken games, rock paper scissors could be easily understood by any audience.

== In popular culture ==
In Naruto, the three legendary Sannin use summoning jutsu that are based on the mushi-ken game's three animals: Orochimaru summons a snake, Jiraiya summons a toad, and Tsunade summons a slug.

== See also ==
- Rock paper scissors – Hand game for two players or more
- Simultaneous action selection – Game mechanic where players act at the same time
- cāi quán - Original Chinese Ken / fist-guessing drinking games as mentioned in history section
