= Likho =

Embodiment of evil and misfortune in Slavic myths

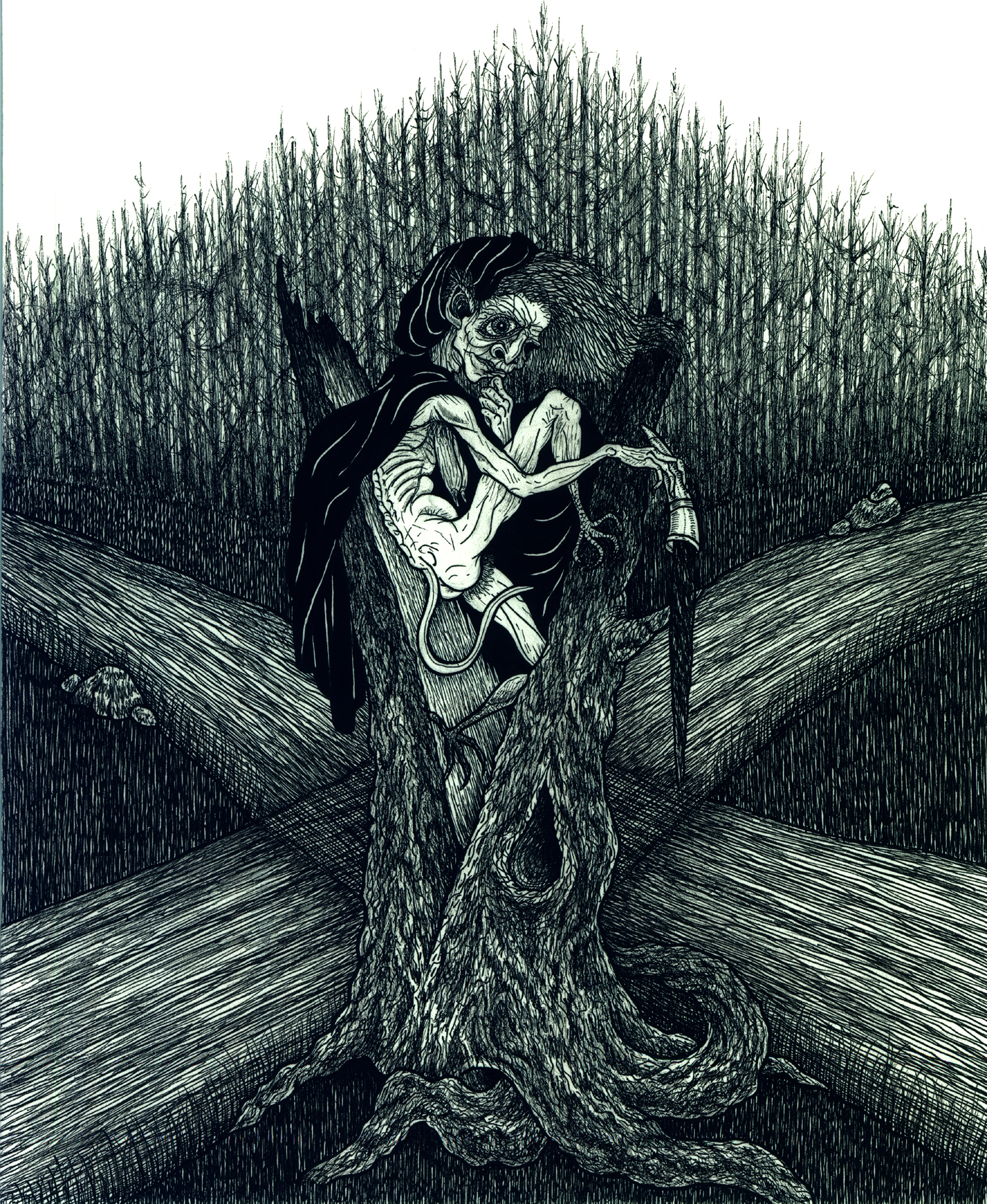
Licho by Marek Hapon

Likho, liho, lykho (Belarusian: лі́ха, Polish: licho, Russian: Лихо, Ukrainian: Лихо) is an embodiment of evil fate and misfortune in Slavic mythology. A creature with one eye who is often depicted as an old, skinny woman in black (Лихо одноглазое, One-eyed Likho) or as an evil male goblin of forests. Rather than being included in the major canon of the Slavic belief system, the Likho is traditionally found in fairy tales.

== Story ==
There are several basic versions of tales about how a person meets with Likho with different morals of the tale.

- A person eventually cheats Likho.
- A person cheats Likho, runs away (with Likho chasing him), sees a valuable thing, grabs it out of greed, their hand sticks to it, and they have to cut off their hand.
- Likho cheats a person and rides on their neck. The person wanting to drown Likho jumps into a river and drowns themself, but Likho floats out to chase other victims.
- Likho is received or passed to another person with a gift.

Within the framework of superstitions, Likho was supposed to come and eat a person. In particular, this was used to scare small children. In Ukrainian folklore, it is sometimes portrayed as type of bad spirit that can cling to one's neck.

== Nomenclature ==
Likho is not a real proper name but a noun meaning bad luck in modern Russian and Ukrainian and the odd number in Polish (obsolete). Several proverbs utilize this term such as the Russian "Не буди лихо, пока оно тихо" and the Ukrainian "Не буди лихо, поки воно тихо", literally translated as "Don't wake likho while it is quiet"; similar to "Don't trouble trouble until trouble troubles you"; or the Polish "Cicho! Licho nie śpi" translated as "Quiet! Evil does not sleep"; and "Licho wie" (literally "Licho [only] knows"), used to mean that a given piece of information is known by no one. In old Russian, the root meant "excessive", "too much", "remaining" and "odd number" (contrasted with chetno in the chetno i likho game) with pejorative connotations, similar to the unlucky 'odd man out'.

Compare to Russian lishniy – one in excess. The word is likely to be related to Indo-European leik^{w} meaning something to remain, to leave. The derived adjective likhoy can be used to describe someone who is a bit too daring or brave. In Czech, lichý means odd (number), idle, vain. In Polish, lichy means shoddy, poor, flimsy. In Belarusian language, ліхі means bad, evil (like in prayer), odd (side of clothing). In Ukrainian language, it is type of bad luck or incident.

== See also ==
- Likhoradka
