= Rock paper scissors =

Hand game for two players or more

- Genres: Hand game
- Players: 2 (or more)
- Setup time: None
- Playing time: seconds
- Chance: High

Rock paper scissors (also known by several other names and word orders) is an intransitive hand game, usually played between two people, in which each player simultaneously forms one of three shapes with an outstretched hand. These shapes are "rock" (a closed fist:), "paper" (a flat hand:), and "scissors" (a fist with the index finger and middle finger extended, forming a V:). The earliest form of a "rock paper scissors"-style game originated in China and was subsequently imported into Japan, where it reached its modern standardized form, before being spread throughout the world in the early 20th century.

A simultaneous, zero-sum game, it has three possible outcomes: a draw, a win, or a loss. A player who decides to play rock will beat another player who chooses scissors ("rock crushes scissors" or "breaks scissors" or sometimes "blunts scissors"), but will lose to one who has played paper ("paper covers rock"); a play of paper will lose to a play of scissors ("scissors cuts paper"). If both players choose the same shape, the game is tied, but is usually replayed until there is a winner.

Rock paper scissors is often used as a fair method of choosing between two options, similar to coin flipping, drawing straws, or throwing dice in order to settle a dispute or make an unbiased group decision. Unlike truly random selection methods, however, rock paper scissors can be played with some degree of skill by recognizing and exploiting non-random behavior in opponents.

== Names ==
The modern game is known by several other names such as Rochambeau, Roshambo, Ro-sham-bo, Bato Bato Pik, and Jan-ken-pon. While the game's name is a list of three items, different countries often have the list in a different order.

In North America and the United Kingdom, it is known as "rock, paper, scissors" or "scissors, paper, stone". Additionally, there are records of the game being referred to as "Rock, scissors, paper" in North America, dating to the early to mid 1900s. If this name is chanted while actually playing the game, it might be followed by an exclamation of "shoot" at the moment when the players are to reveal their choice (i.e. "Rock, paper, scissors, shoot!").

In Australia; it is referred to as "scissors, paper, rock" in New South Wales, "rock, paper, scissors" in Victoria, South Australia and Western Australia, and "paper, scissors, rock" in Queensland.

In New Zealand, the most common name in English is "paper, scissors, rock". In Māori, it is known as pēpa, kutikuti, kōhatu (lit. 'paper, scissors, rock').

=== Etymology ===
The name "rock paper scissors" is simply a translation of the Japanese words for the three gestures involved in the game, though the Japanese name for the game is different.

The name Roshambo or Rochambeau has been claimed to refer to Count Rochambeau, who allegedly played the game during the American Revolutionary War. The legend that he played the game is apocryphal, as all evidence points to the game being brought to the United States later than 1910; if this name has anything to do with him it is for some other reason. It is unclear why this name became associated with the game, with hypotheses ranging from a slight phonetic similarity with the Japanese name jan-ken-pon, to the presence of a statue of Rochambeau in a neighborhood of Washington, DC.

== Gameplay ==
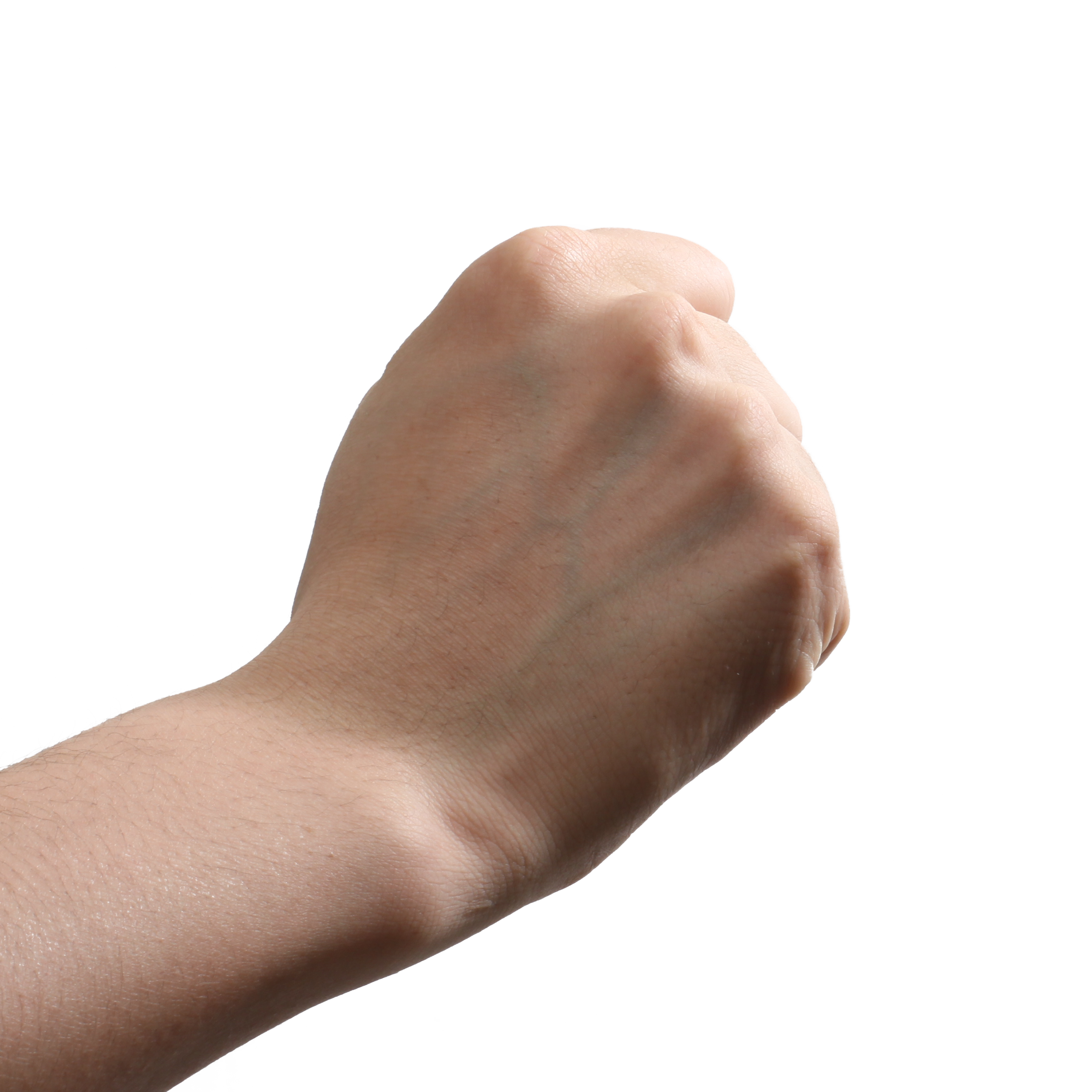
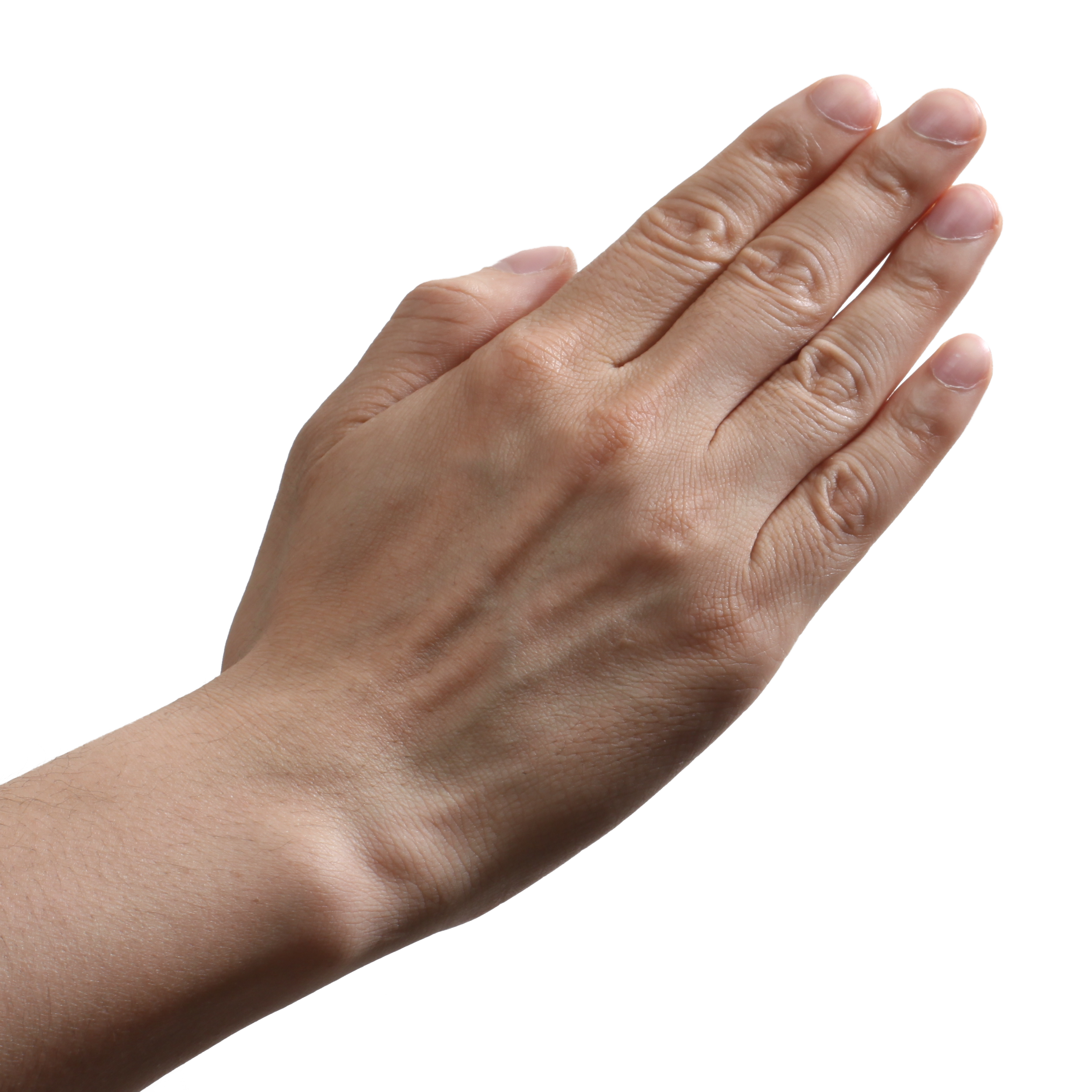
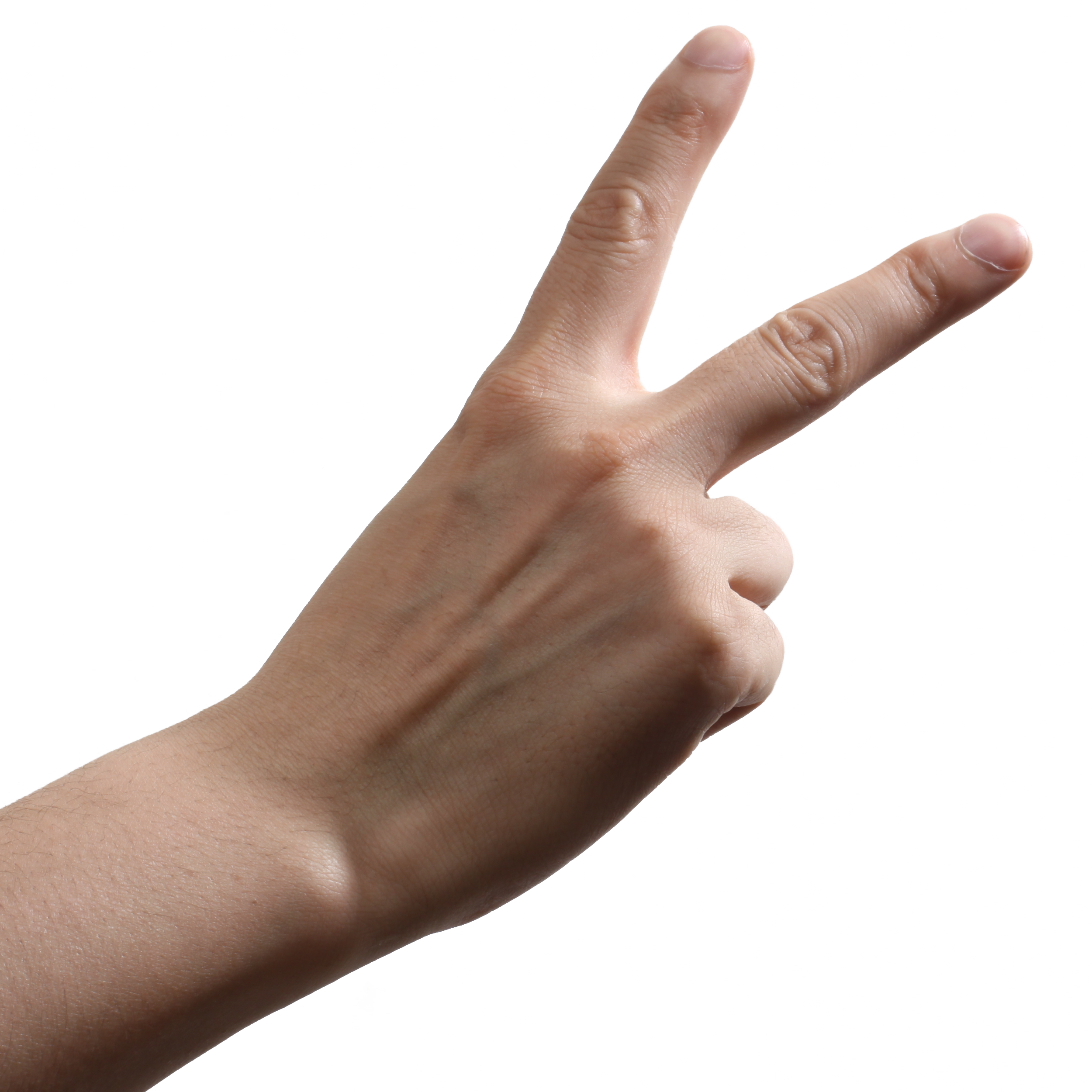
Each of the three basic hand signs (from left to right: rock, paper, and scissors) beats one of the other two, and loses to the other.

The players may start by counting to three aloud, or by speaking the name of the game (e.g. "Rock! Paper! Scissors!"), raising one hand in a fist and swinging it down with each syllable onto their other hand (or in a less common variant, holding it behind their back). They then "throw" or "shoot" by extending their selected sign towards their opponent on what would have been the fourth count, often saying the word "shoot" while doing so.

Variations include a version where players throw immediately on the third count (thus throwing on the count of "Scissors!"), a version including five counts rather than four ("Rock! Paper! Scissors! Says! Shoot!"), and a version where players say "Scissors! Paper! Rock!", and a version where players shake their hands three times before "throwing".

== History ==
=== Origins ===
The first known mention of the game was in the book Wuzazu by the Ming-dynasty writer Xie Zhaozhe (fl. c. 1600), who wrote that the game dated back to the time of the Han dynasty, where it was played by warlords. In the book, the game was called shoushiling. Li Rihua's book Note of Liuyanzhai also mentions this game, calling it shoushiling (t. 手勢令; s. 手势令), huozhitou (t. 豁指頭; s. 豁指头), or huaquan (划拳).

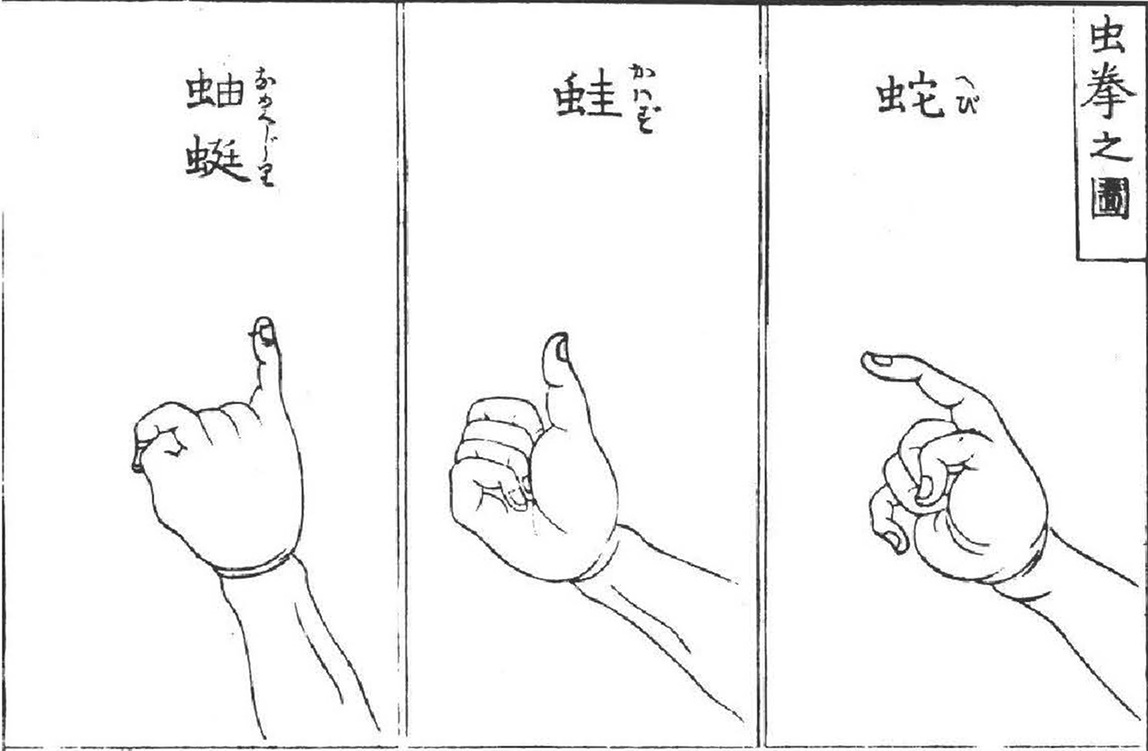
Mushi-ken, the earliest Japanese sansukumi-ken game (1809). From left to right: slug (namekuji), frog (kawazu) and snake (hebi).

From China the game was brought to Japan. Throughout Japanese history there are frequent references to sansukumi-ken, meaning ken (fist) games "of the three who are afraid of one another" (i.e. A beats B, B beats C, and C beats A).

The earliest sansukumi-ken in Japan was apparently mushi-ken (虫拳), a version imported directly from China. In mushi-ken the "frog" (represented by the thumb) triumphs over the "slug" (represented by the little finger), which, in turn prevails over the "snake" (represented by the index finger), which triumphs over the "frog". (The Chinese and Japanese versions differ in the animals represented; in adopting the game, the Chinese characters for the venomous centipede (蜈蜙) were apparently confused with the characters for the slug (蛞蝓)).

The most popular sansukumi-ken game in Japan was kitsune-ken (狐拳). In this game, a fox (狐), often attributed supernatural powers in Japanese folklore, defeats the village head, the village head (庄屋) defeats the hunter, and the hunter (猟師) defeats the fox. Kitsune-ken, unlike mushi-ken or rock–paper–scissors, requires gestures with both hands.

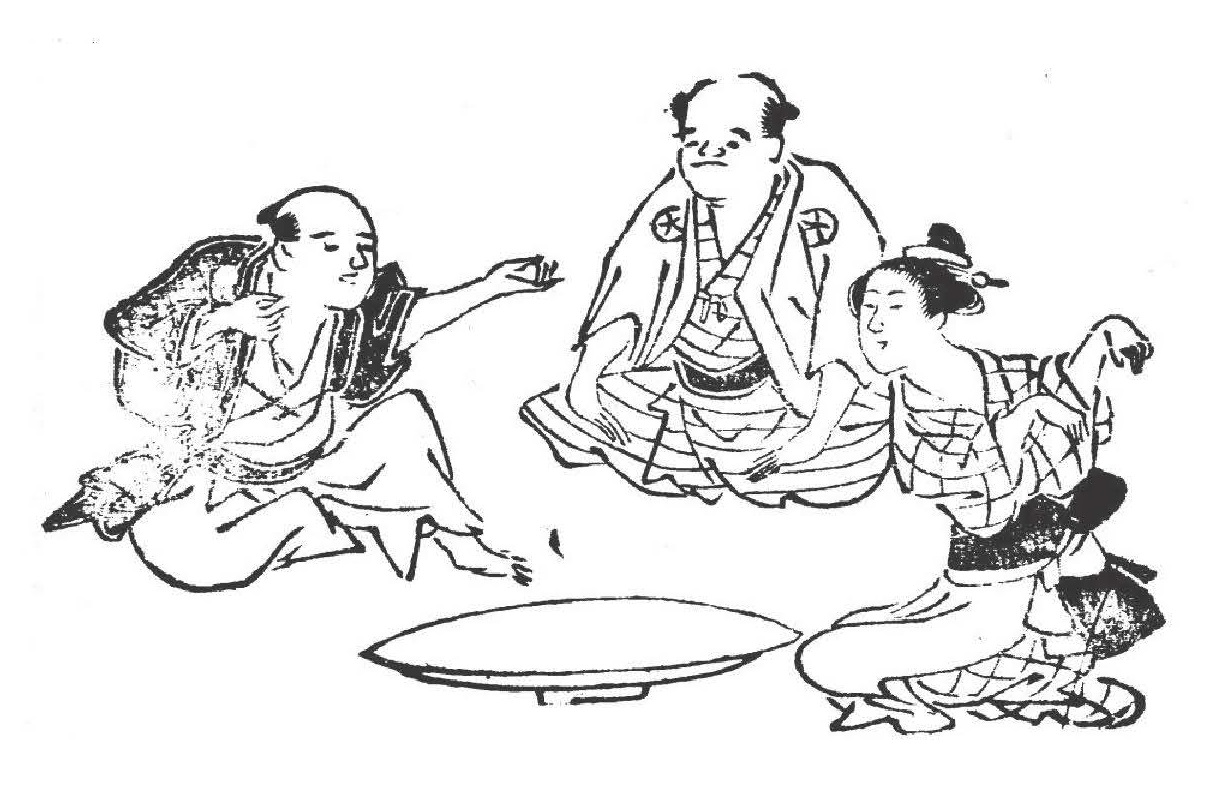
Kitsune-ken was a popular Japanese rock paper scissors variant. From left to right: The hunter (ryōshi), village head (shōya) and fox (kitsune).

Today, the best-known sansukumi-ken is called jan-ken (じゃんけん), which is a variation of the Chinese games introduced in the 17th century. Jan-ken uses the rock, paper, and scissors signs and is the direct source of the modern version of rock paper scissors. Hand-games using gestures to represent the three conflicting elements of rock, paper, and scissors have been most common since the modern version of the game was created in the late 19th century, between the Edo and Meiji periods.

=== Spread beyond East Asia ===
By the early 20th century, rock paper scissors had spread beyond East Asia, especially through increased Japanese contact with the west. Its English-language name is therefore taken from a translation of the names of the three Japanese hand-gestures for rock, paper and scissors; elsewhere in East Asia the open-palm gesture represents "cloth" rather than "paper". The shape of the scissors is also adopted from the Japanese style.

A 1921 article about cricket in the Sydney Morning Herald described "stone, scissors, and paper" as a "Teutonic method of drawing lots", which the writer "came across when travelling on the Continent once". Another article, from the same year, the Washington Herald described it as a method of "Chinese gambling". In Britain in 1924 it was described in a letter to The Times as a hand game, possibly of Mediterranean origin, called "zhot". A reader then wrote in to say that the game "zhot" referred to was evidently Jan-ken-pon, which she had often seen played throughout Japan. Although at this date the game appears to have been new enough to British readers to need explaining, the appearance by 1927 of Gerard Fairlie's popular thriller novel with the title Scissors Cut Paper, followed by Fairlie's Stone Blunts Scissors (1929), suggests it quickly became popular.

The game is referred to in two of Hildegard G. Frey's novels in the Campfire Girls series: The Campfire Girls Go Motoring (1916) and The Campfire Girls' Larks and Pranks (1917), which suggests that it was known in America at least that early. The first passage where it appears says "In order that no feelings might be involved in any way over which car we other girls traveled in, Nyoda, Solomon-like, proposed that she and Gladys play 'John Kempo' for us. (That isn't spelled right, but no matter.)" There is no explanation in any of the places where it is referenced of what the game actually is. This suggests that the author at least believed that the game was well known enough in America that her readers would understand the reference.

In 1927 La Vie au patronage : organe catholique des œuvres de jeunesse, a children's magazine in France, described it in detail, referring to it as a "jeu japonais" ("Japanese game"). Its French name, "Chi-fou-mi", is based on the Old Japanese words for "one, two, three" ("hi, fu, mi").

A 1932 New York Times article on the Tokyo rush hour describes the rules of the game for the benefit of American readers, suggesting it was not at that time widely known in the U.S. Likewise, the trick-taking card game "Jan-Ken-Po", first published in 1934, describes the rules of the hand-game without mentioning any American game along the lines of "rock paper scissors". The 1933 edition of the Compton's Pictured Encyclopedia described it as a common method of settling disputes between children in its article on Japan; the name was given as "John Kem Po" and the article pointedly asserted, "This is such a good way of deciding an argument that American boys and girls might like to practice it too."

== Strategies ==
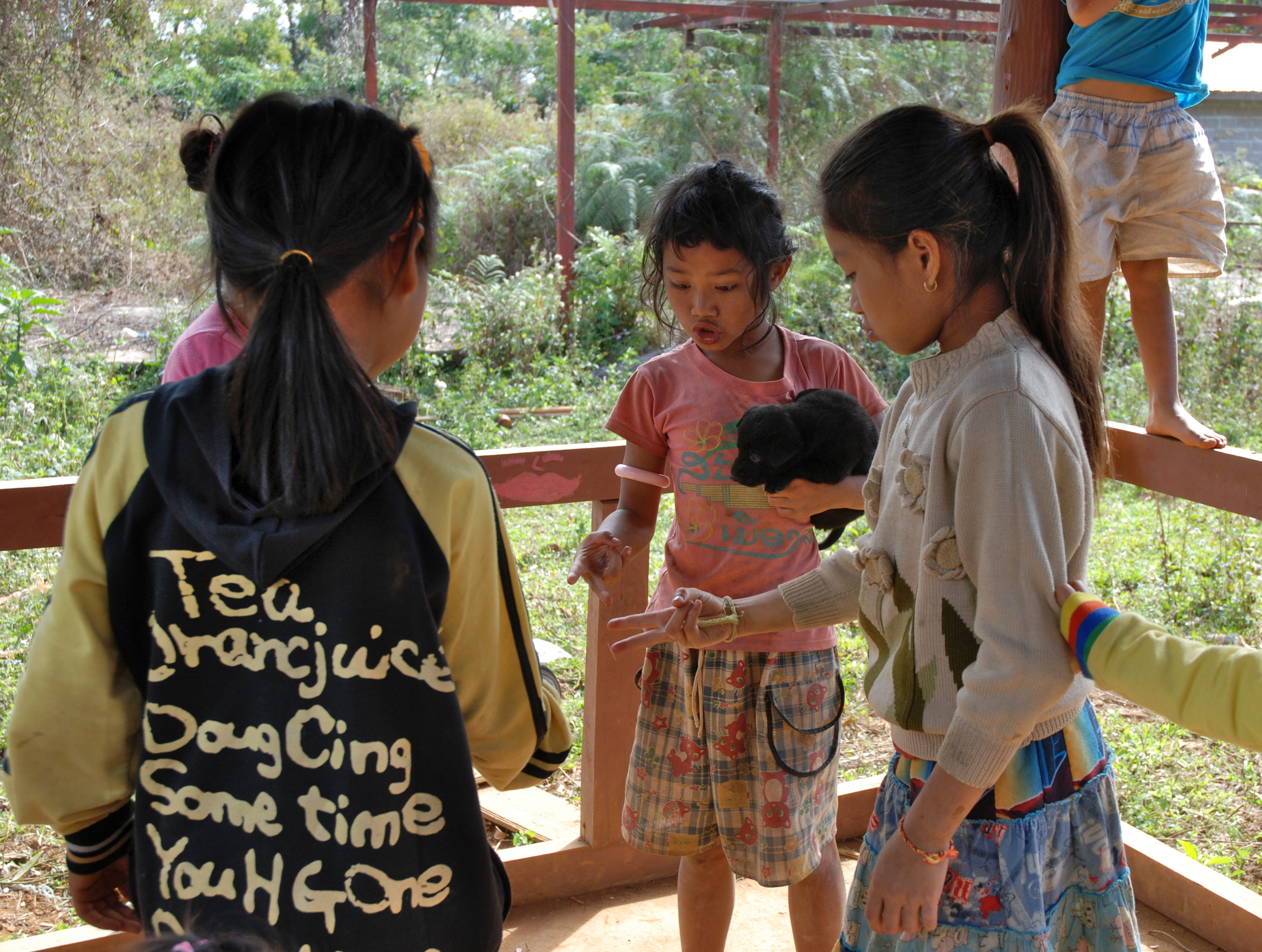
Children in Laos playing rock paper scissors

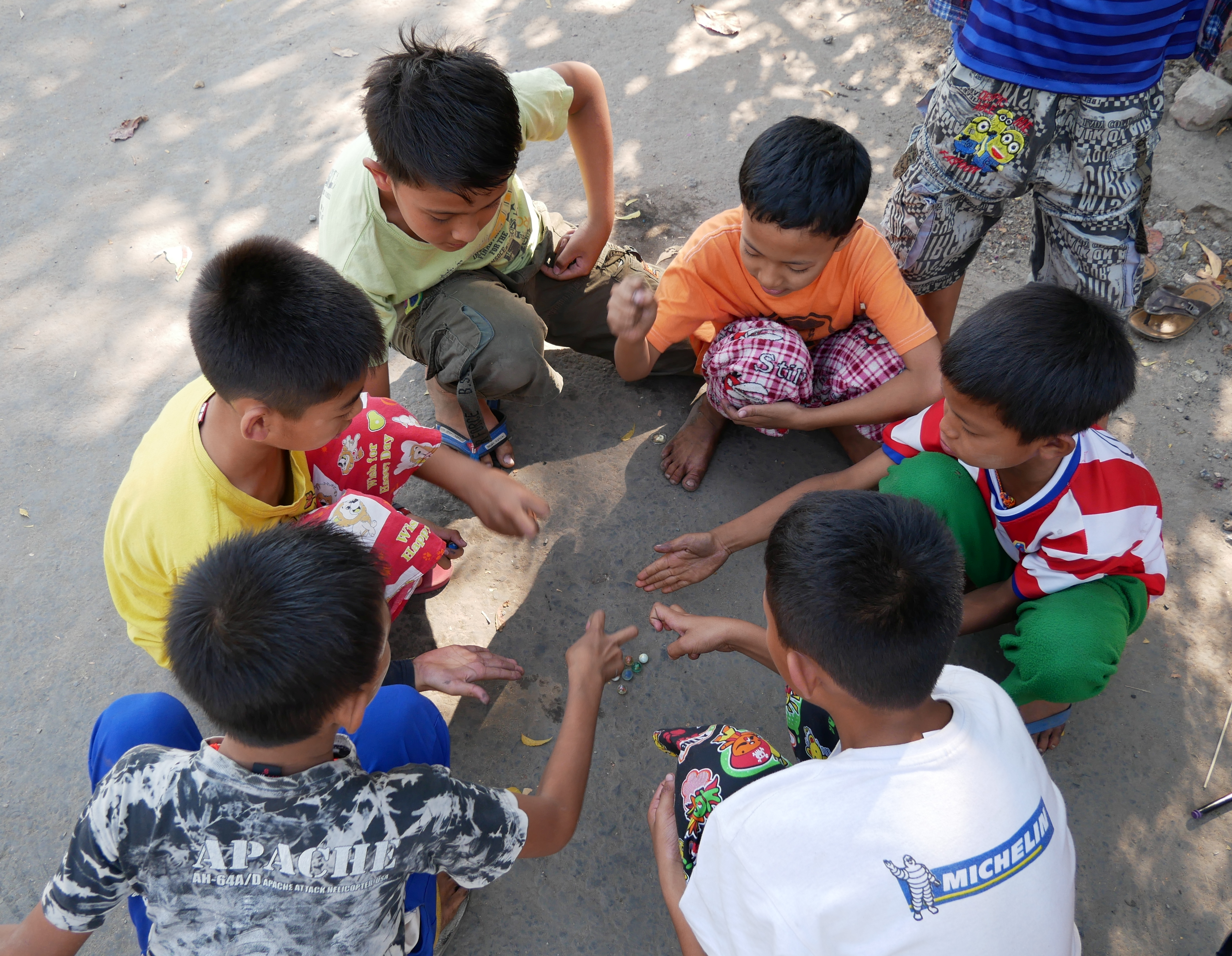
Children in Myanmar playing rock paper scissors

It is impossible to gain an advantage over an opponent that chooses their move uniformly at random. However, it is possible to gain a significant advantage over a non-random player by predicting their move, which can be done by exploiting psychological effects or by analyzing statistical patterns of their past behavior. As a result, there have been programming competitions for algorithms that play rock paper scissors.

During tournaments, players often prepare their sequence of three gestures prior to the tournament's commencement. Some tournament players employ tactics to confuse or trick the other player into making an illegal move, resulting in a loss. One such tactic is to shout the name of one move before throwing another, in order to misdirect and confuse their opponent.

The "rock" move, in particular, is notable in that it is typically represented by a closed fist—often identical to the fist made by players during the initial countdown. If a player is attempting to beat their opponent based on quickly reading their hand gesture as the players are making their moves, it is possible to determine if the opponent is about to throw "rock" based on their lack of hand movement, as both "scissors" and "paper" require the player to reposition their hand. This can likewise be used to deceive an anticipating opponent by keeping one's fist closed until the last possible moment, leading them to believe that one is about to throw "rock".

=== Algorithms ===
As a consequence of rock paper scissors programming contests, many strong algorithms have emerged. For example, Iocaine Powder, which won the First International RoShamBo Programming Competition in 1999, uses a heuristically designed compilation of strategies. For each strategy it employs, it also has six metastrategies which defeat second-guessing, triple-guessing, as well as second-guessing the opponent, and so on. The optimal strategy or metastrategy is chosen based on past performance. The main strategies it employs are history matching, frequency analysis, and random guessing. Its strongest strategy, history matching, searches for a sequence in the past that matches the last few moves in order to predict the next move of the algorithm. In frequency analysis, the program simply identifies the most frequently played move. The random guess is a fallback method that is used to prevent a devastating loss in the event that the other strategies fail. There have since been some innovations, such as using multiple history-matching schemes that each match a different aspect of the history – for example, the opponent's moves, the program's own moves, or a combination of both. There have also been other algorithms based on Markov chains.

In 2012, researchers from the Ishikawa Watanabe Laboratory at the University of Tokyo created a robot hand that can play rock paper scissors with a 100% win rate against a human opponent. Using a high-speed camera the robot recognizes within one millisecond which shape the human hand is making, then produces the corresponding winning shape.

== Variations ==
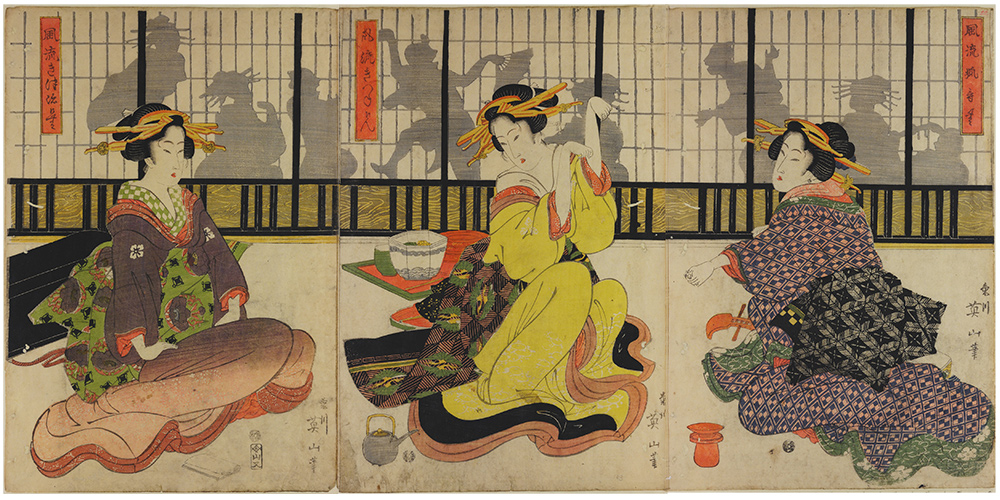
A print by Kikukawa Eizan that shows geisha playing kitsune-ken, a Japanese rock paper scissors variant (1820)

There exist numerous cultural and personal variations on rock paper scissors. Differences vary from simply playing the same game with different objects to expanding into more weapons and rules.

=== Different rules ===
In Korea, where the standard version of the game is called gawi-bawi-bo, a more complex version exists by the name muk-jji-ppa. After showing their hands, the player with the winning throw shouts "muk-jji-ppa!" upon which both players throw again. If they throw differently, whoever wins this second round shouts "muk-jji-ppa!" and thus the play continues until both players throw the same, at which point whoever was the last winner becomes the final winner.

In "rock paper scissors minus one", another popular variant in Korea, both players throw with both hands simultaneously. Each player chooses one hand to remove, and the winner is decided by the remaining hands in play; a tie leads to a replay. This variation was featured in the second season of the Netflix series Squid Game.

In Japan, a strip game variant of rock paper scissors is known as 野球拳 (Yakyūken). The loser of each round removes an article of clothing. The game is a minor part of porn culture in Japan and other Asian countries after the influence of TV variety shows and Soft On Demand.

In the Philippines, the game is called jak-en-poy (from the Japanese jankenpon). The longer form of the game has the players sing a rhyme, with the hand gestures at play shown either at the end of each line or revealed at the final one: "Jack-en-poy! / Hali-hali-hoy! / Sino'ng matalo, / siya'ng unggóy!" ("Jack-en-poy! / Hali-hali-hoy! / Whoever loses is the monkey!") In the former case, the winner is whoever has the most winning hands by the end of the song. A shorter version of the game instead uses the chant "Bató-bató-pick" ("Rock-rock-pick [i.e. choose]").

A variation with more players can be played: Players stand in a circle and all throw at once. If rock, paper, and scissors are all thrown, it is a stalemate, and they rethrow. If only two throws are present, all players with the losing throw are eliminated. Play continues until only the winner remains.

=== Different weapons ===
In Indonesia, the game is called suten, suit or just sut, and the three signs are elephant (slightly raised thumb), human (outstretched index finger) and ant (outstretched pinky finger). Elephant is stronger than human, human is stronger than ant, but elephant is afraid of the ant.

Using the same tripartite division, there is a full-body variation in lieu of the hand signs called "Bear, Hunter, Ninja". In this iteration the participants stand back-to-back and at the count of three (or ro-sham-bo as is traditional) turn around facing each other using their arms evoking one of the totems. The players' choices break down as: Hunter shoots bear; Bear eats ninja; Ninja kills hunter.

=== Additional weapons ===
Generalized rock-paper-scissors games where the players have a choice of more than three weapons have been studied. Any variation of rock paper scissors is an oriented graph, where the nodes represent the symbols (weapons) choosable by the players, and an edge from A to B means that A defeats B. Each oriented graph is a potentially playable rock paper scissors game. According to theoretical calculations, the number of distinguishable (i.e. not isomorphic) oriented graphs grows with the number of weapons = 3, 4, 5, ... as follows:

7, 42, 582, 21480, 2142288, 575016219, 415939243032, ... (sequence A001174 in the OEIS).

The French game pierre, papier, ciseaux, puits (stone, paper, scissors, well) is unbalanced; both the stone and scissors fall in the well and lose to it, while paper covers both stone and well. This means two "weapons", well and paper, can defeat two moves, while the other two weapons each defeat only one of the other three choices. The stone has no advantage to well, so optimal strategy is to play each of the other objects (paper, scissors and well) one-third of the time.

"pierre, papier, ciseaux, puits"; + means that the row player "beats", − means "is beaten" and O means tie
Opponent Row player	stone	paper	scissors	well	Optimal strategy for the row player
stone	O	−	+	−	$0$
paper	+	O	−	+	$\frac{1}{3}$
scissors	−	+	O	−	$\frac{1}{3}$
well	+	−	+	O	$\frac{1}{3}$

Variants in which the number of moves is an odd number and each move defeats exactly half of the other moves while being defeated by the other half are typically considered. Variations with up to 101 different moves have been published. Adding new gestures has the effect of reducing the odds of a tie, while increasing the complexity of the game. The probability of a tie in an odd-number-of-weapons game can be calculated based on the number of weapons n as 1/n, so the probability of a tie is 1/3 in standard rock paper scissors, but 1/5 in a version that offered five moves instead of three.

Rock paper scissors lizard Spock gestures

One popular five-weapon expansion is "rock paper scissors Spock lizard", invented by Sam Kass and Karen Bryla, which adds "Spock" and "lizard" to the standard three choices. "Spock" is signified with the Star Trek Vulcan salute, while "lizard" is shown by forming the hand into a sock-puppet-like mouth. Spock smashes scissors and vaporizes rock; he is poisoned by lizard and disproved by paper. Lizard poisons Spock and eats paper; it is crushed by rock and decapitated by scissors. This variant was mentioned in a 2005 article in The Times of London and was later the subject of an episode of the American sitcom The Big Bang Theory in 2008 (as rock-paper-scissors-lizard-Spock).

Rock-Paper-Scissors-Spock-Lizard; + means that the row player "beats", − means "is beaten" and O means tie
Opponent Row player	rock	paper	scissors	Spock	lizard	Optimal strategy for row player
rock	O	−	+	−	+	$\frac{1}{5}$
paper	+	O	−	+	−	$\frac{1}{5}$
scissors	−	+	O	−	+	$\frac{1}{5}$
Spock	+	−	+	O	−	$\frac{1}{5}$
lizard	−	+	−	+	O	$\frac{1}{5}$

Oriented graph of Rock-Paper-Scissors-Fire-Water

A game-theoretic analysis showed that 4 variants of 582 possible variations using 5 different weapons have non-trivial mixed strategy equilibria. The most representative game of these 4 is "rock, paper, scissors, fire, water". Rock beats scissors, paper beats rock, scissors beats paper, fire beats everything except water, and water is beaten by everything except it beats fire. The perfect game-theoretic strategy is to use rock, paper, and scissors $\frac{1}{9}$ of the time and $\frac{1}{3}$ of the time for fire and water. Nevertheless, experiments show that people underuse water and overuse rock, paper, and scissors in this game.

Rock-Paper-Scissors-Fire-Water; + means that the row player "beats", − means "is beaten" and O means tie
Opponent Row player	rock	paper	scissors	fire	water	Optimal strategy for row player
rock	O	−	+	−	+	$\frac{1}{9}$
paper	+	O	−	−	+	$\frac{1}{9}$
scissors	−	+	O	−	+	$\frac{1}{9}$
fire	+	+	+	O	−	$\frac{1}{3}$
water	−	−	−	+	O	$\frac{1}{3}$

== Analogues in real life ==
=== Lizard mating strategies ===
The common side-blotched lizard (Uta stansburiana) exhibits a rock paper scissors pattern in its mating strategies. Of its three throat color types of males, "orange beats blue, blue beats yellow, and yellow beats orange" in competition for females, which is similar to the rules of rock-paper-scissors.

=== Bacteria ===
Some bacteria also exhibit a rock paper scissors dynamic when they engage in antibiotic production. The theory for this finding was demonstrated by computer simulation and in the laboratory by Benjamin Kerr, working at Stanford University with Brendan Bohannan. Additional in vitro results demonstrate rock paper scissors dynamics in additional species of bacteria. Biologist Benjamin C. Kirkup Jr. demonstrated that these antibiotics, bacteriocins, were active as Escherichia coli compete with each other in the intestines of mice, and that the rock paper scissors dynamics allowed for the continued competition among strains: antibiotic-producers defeat antibiotic-sensitives; antibiotic-resisters multiply and withstand and out-compete the antibiotic-producers, letting antibiotic-sensitives multiply and out-compete others; until antibiotic-producers multiply again.

Rock paper scissors is the subject of continued research in bacterial ecology and evolution. It is considered one of the basic applications of game theory and non-linear dynamics to bacteriology. Models of evolution demonstrate how intragenomic competition can lead to rock paper scissors dynamics from a relatively general evolutionary model. The general nature of this basic non-transitive model is widely applied in theoretical biology to explore bacterial ecology and evolution.

=== Mechanical devices and geometrical constructions ===
In the televised robot combat competition BattleBots, relations between "lifters, which had wedged sides and could use forklift-like prongs to flip pure wedges", "spinners, which were smooth, circular wedges with blades on their bottom side for disabling and breaking lifters", and "pure wedges, which could still flip spinners" are analogical to relations in rock paper scissors games and called "robot Darwinism".

== Instances of usage ==
=== American court case ===
In 2006, American federal judge Gregory Presnell from the Middle District of Florida ordered opposing sides in a lengthy court case to settle a trivial (but lengthily debated) point over the appropriate place for a deposition using the game of rock paper scissors. The ruling in Avista Management v. Wausau Underwriters stated:

Upon consideration of the Motion – the latest in a series of Gordian knots that the parties have been unable to untangle without enlisting the assistance of the federal courts – it is ORDERED that said Motion is DENIED. Instead, the Court will fashion a new form of alternative dispute resolution, to wit: at 4:00 P.M. on Friday, June 30, 2006, counsel shall convene at a neutral site agreeable to both parties. If counsel cannot agree on a neutral site, they shall meet on the front steps of the Sam M. Gibbons U.S. Courthouse, 801 North Florida Ave., Tampa, Florida 33602. Each lawyer shall be entitled to be accompanied by one paralegal who shall act as an attendant and witness. At that time and location, counsel shall engage in one (1) game of "rock, paper, scissors". The winner of this engagement shall be entitled to select the location for the 30(b)(6) deposition to be held somewhere in Hillsborough County during the period 11–12 July 2006.

=== Auction house selection ===
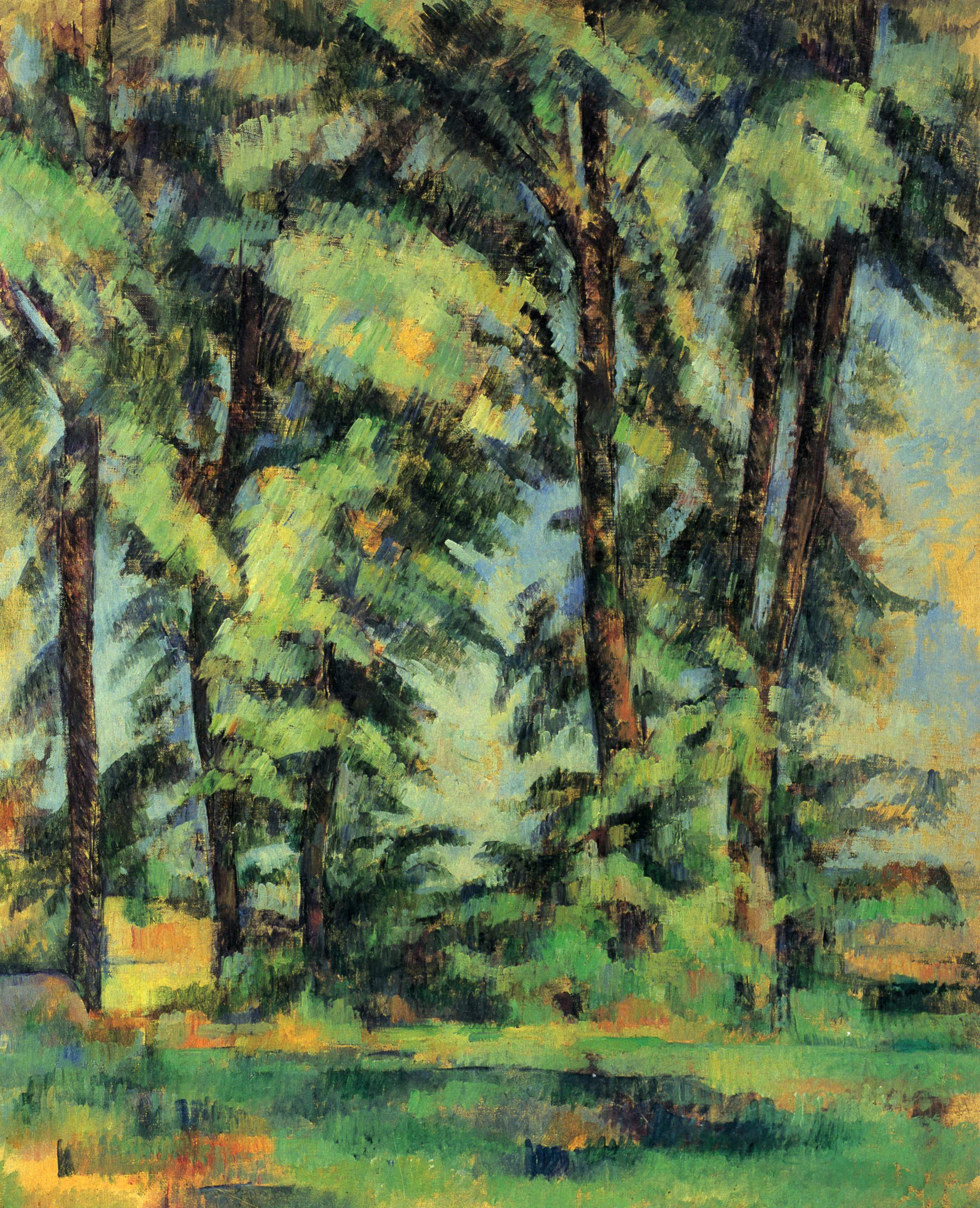
Cézanne's Large Trees Under the Jas de Bouffan sold for $11,776,000 at Christie's in 2005.

In 2005, when Takashi Hashiyama, CEO of Japanese television equipment manufacturer Maspro Denkoh, decided to auction off the collection of Impressionist paintings owned by his corporation, including works by Paul Cézanne, Pablo Picasso, and Vincent van Gogh, he contacted two leading auction houses, Christie's International and Sotheby's Holdings, seeking their proposals on how they would bring the collection to the market as well as how they would maximize the profits from the sale. Both firms made elaborate proposals, but neither was persuasive enough to earn Hashiyama's approval. Unwilling to split up the collection into separate auctions, Hashiyama asked the firms to decide between themselves who would hold the auction, which included Cézanne's Large Trees Under the Jas de Bouffan, estimated to be worth between $12 million to $16 million.

The houses were unable to reach a decision. Hashiyama told the two firms to play rock paper scissors to decide who would get the rights to the auction, explaining that "it probably looks strange to others, but I believe this is the best way to decide between two things which are equally good."

The auction houses had a weekend to come up with a choice of move. Christie's went to the 11-year-old twin daughters of the international director of Christie's Impressionist and Modern Art Department Nicholas Maclean, who suggested "scissors" because "Everybody expects you to choose 'rock'." Sotheby's said that they treated it as a game of chance and had no particular strategy for the game, but went with "paper". Christie's won the match and sold the $20 million collection, earning millions of dollars of commission for the auction house.

=== FA Women's Super League match ===
Prior to a 26 October 2018 match in the FA Women's Super League, the referee, upon being without a coin for the pregame coin toss, had the team captains play rock paper scissors to determine which team would kick-off. The referee was subsequently suspended for three weeks by The Football Association.

=== Play by chimpanzees ===
In Japan, researchers have taught chimpanzees to identify winning hands according to the rules of rock paper scissors.

=== 2027 London Marathon ===
In September 2026, a rock paper scissors match was used to determine the dates for the male and female 2027 London Marathon races.

=== Game design ===
In many games, it is common for a group of possible choices to interact in a rock paper scissors style, where each selection is strong against a particular choice, but weak against another. Such mechanics can make a game somewhat self-balancing, preventing gameplay from being overwhelmed by a single dominant strategy or unit.

Many card-based video games in Japan use the rock paper scissors system as their core fighting system, with the winner of each round being able to carry out their designated attack. In Alex Kidd in Miracle World, the player has to win games of rock paper scissors against each boss to proceed. Others use simple variants of rock paper scissors as subgames.

Many Nintendo role-playing games prominently feature a rock paper scissors gameplay element. In Pokémon, there is a rock paper scissors element in the type effectiveness system. For example, a Grass-typed Pokémon is weak to Fire, Fire is weak to Water, and Water is weak to Grass. In the 3DS remake of Mario & Luigi: Superstar Saga and Mario & Luigi: Bowser's Inside Story, the battles in the second mode use a "Power Triangle" system based on the game's three attack types: Melee, Ranged, and Flying. In the Fire Emblem series of strategy role-playing games, the Weapon Triangle and Trinity of Magic influence the hit and damage rates of weapon types based on whether they are at an advantage or a disadvantage in their respective rock paper scissors system. In the Super Smash Bros. series, the three basic actions used during battles are described in their respective rock paper scissors system: attack, defense, and grab.

The "Card-Jitsu" minigame in Club Penguin is a rock-paper-scissors game using cards that represent the three elements, Fire, Water and Snow. Fire beats snow, snow beats water, water beats fire.

== Tournaments ==
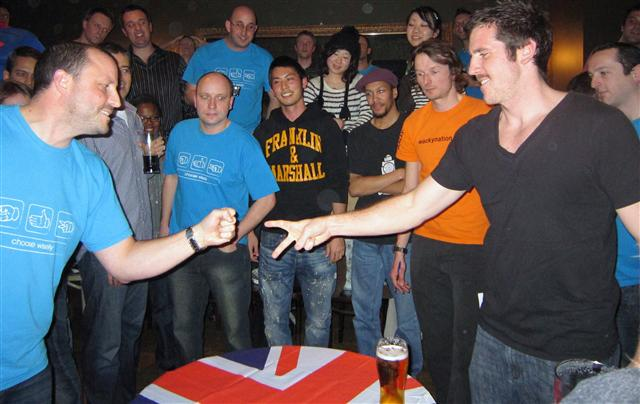
Two players at the 4th UK Rock Paper Scissors Championships, 2010

Various competitive rock paper scissors tournaments have been organised by different groups.

=== World Rock Paper Scissors Society ===
The World Rock Paper Scissors Society hosted Professional Rock Paper Scissors Tournaments from 2002 to 2009. These open, competitive championships were widely attended by players from around the world and attracted widespread international media attention. WRPS events were noted for their large cash prizes, elaborate staging, and colorful competitors. In 2004, the championships were broadcast on the U.S. television network Fox Sports Net (later known as Bally Sports), with the winner being Lee Rammage, who went on to compete in at least one subsequent championship. The 2007 tournament was won by Andrea Farina. The last tournament hosted by the World RPS Society was in Toronto, Canada, on November 14, 2009.

=== USARPS tournaments ===
USA Rock Paper Scissors League is sponsored by Bud Light. Leo Bryan Pacis was the first commissioner of the USARPS. Cody Louis Brown was elected as the second commissioner of the USARPS in 2014. He resigned in 2025, and was replaced by J. Juelis by popular vote.

In April 2006, the inaugural USARPS Championship was held in Las Vegas. Following months of regional qualifying tournaments held across the US, 257 players were flown to Las Vegas for a single-elimination tournament at the House of Blues where the winner received $50,000. The tournament was shown on the A&E Network on 12 June 2006.

The $50,000 2007 USARPS Tournament took place at the Las Vegas Mandalay Bay in May 2007.

In 2008, Sean "Wicked Fingers" Sears beat 300 other contestants and walked out of the Mandalay Bay Hotel and Casino with $50,000 after defeating Julie "Bulldog" Crossley in the finals.

The inaugural Budweiser International Rock, Paper, Scissors Federation Championship was held in Beijing, China after the close of the 2008 Summer Olympics at Club Bud. A Belfast man won the competition.

=== World Series ===
Former Celebrity Poker Showdown host and USARPS Head Referee Phil Gordon has hosted an annual $500 World Series of Rock Paper Scissors event in conjunction with the World Series of Poker since 2005. The winner of the WSORPS receives an entry into the WSOP Main Event. The event is an annual fundraiser for the "Cancer Research and Prevention Foundation" via Gordon's charity Bad Beat on Cancer. Poker player Annie Duke won the Second Annual World Series of Rock Paper Scissors. The tournament is taped by ESPN and highlights are covered during "The Nuts" section of ESPN's annual WSOP broadcast. 2009 was the fifth year of the tournament.

=== Jackpot En Poy of Eat Bulaga! ===
Jackpot En Poy is a game segment on the Philippines' longest running noontime variety show, Eat Bulaga!. The game is based on the classic children's game rock paper scissors (Jak-en-poy in Filipino, derived from the Japanese Jan-ken-pon) where four players are paired to compete in the three-round segment. In the first round, the first pair plays against each other until one player wins three times. The next pair then plays against each other in the second round. The winners from the first two rounds then compete against each other to finally determine the ultimate winner. The winner of the game then moves on to the final round. In the final round, the player is presented with several Dabarkads, each holding different amounts of cash prize. The player will then pick three Dabarkads against whom they will play rock paper scissors. The player plays against them one at a time. If the player wins against any of the Eat Bulaga! hosts, they will win the cash prize.

== See also ==
- Chopsticks (hand game)
- Intransitive dice
- Intransitive game
- Matching pennies, the binary equivalent
- Mixed strategy
- Morra (game), another hand game for deciding trivial matters
- Rock paper scissors and human social cyclic behavior
- Simultaneous action selection
