= Simultaneous action selection =

Game mechanic where players act at the same time

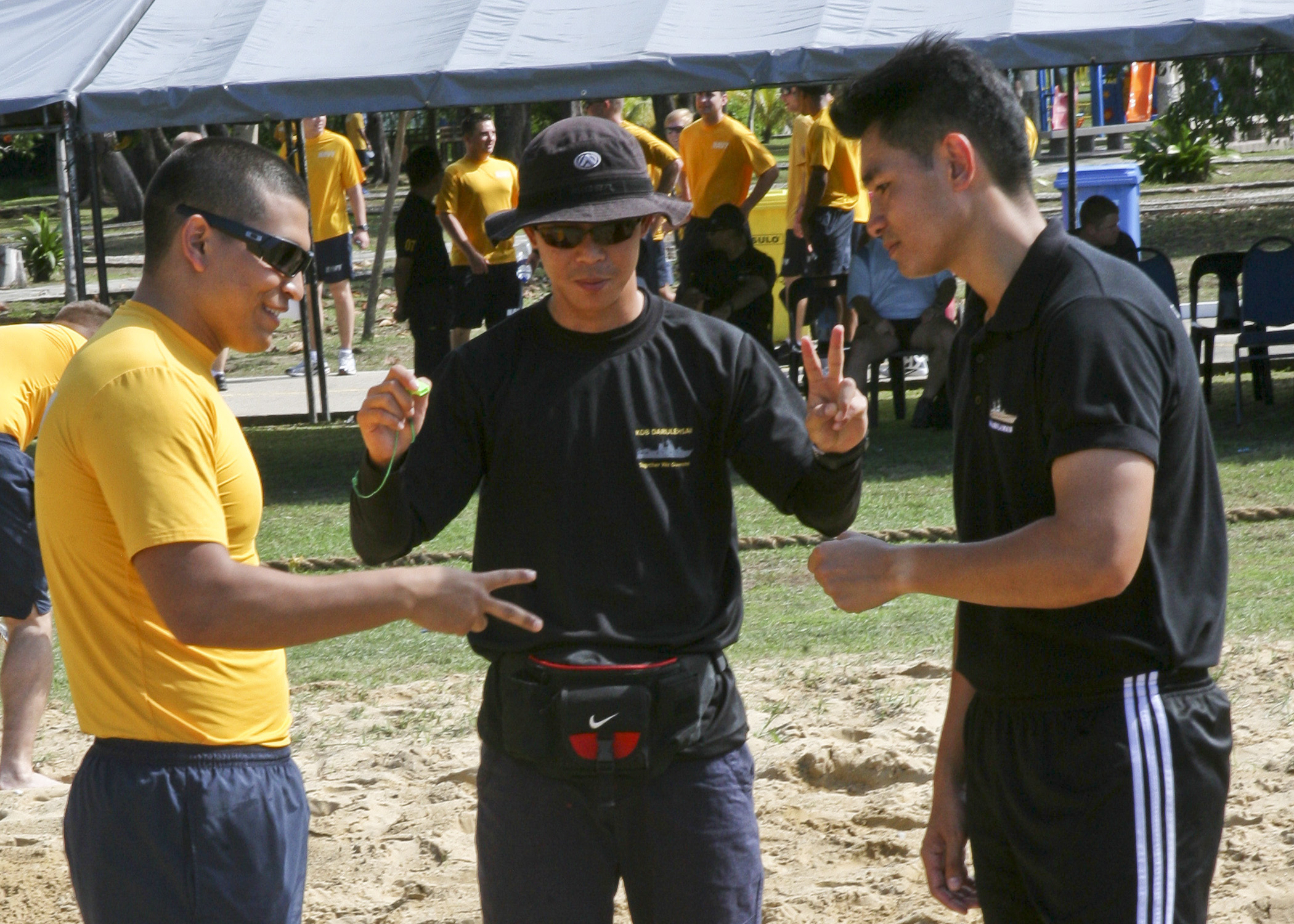
Rock–paper–scissors is an example of a game which employs simultaneous action selection.

Simultaneous action selection, or SAS, is a game mechanic that occurs when players of a game take action (such as moving their pieces) at the same time. Examples of games that use this type of movement include rock–paper–scissors and Diplomacy.

Typically, a "secret yet binding" method of committing to one's move is necessary, so that as players' moves are revealed and implemented, others do not change their moves in light of the new information. In Diplomacy, players write down their moves and then reveal them simultaneously.

Because no player gets the first move, this potentially arbitrary source of advantage is not present. It is also possible for simultaneous movement games to proceed relatively quickly, because players are acting at the same time, rather than waiting for their turn.

Simultaneous action selection is easily implemented in card games such as Apples to Apples in which players simply select cards and throw them face-down into the center.

== Limitations ==
Some games do not lend themselves to simultaneous movement, because one player's move may be prevented by the other player's. For instance, in chess, a move of a bishop takes queen would be incompatible with a simultaneous opposing move of queen takes bishop. By contrast, simultaneous movement is possible in Junta because each coup phase has a movement stage and a separate combat stage; no units are removed until all have had a chance to move. It has been noted that "a certain amount of reverse psychology and reverse-reverse psychology ensues" as players attempt to calculate the implications of others' potential actions. Junta also has simultaneous action selection in that players secretly choose their locations at the same time. This is important in that, for instance, a player plotting an assassination may choose the bank for his or her own location (hoping to quickly deposit the ill-gotten gains) before finding out whether the target of his or her assassination was on the mark.

== Real world applications ==
Simultaneous action selection is used in many real-world applications such as first-price sealed-bid auctions. The fact that no bidder knows what others are planning to bid may provide an incentive to bid high if there is a strong desire to win the auction, which can result in much higher winning bids than if better information were available. The prisoner's dilemma is another classic example of simultaneous action selection. SAS can also be used to introduce an element of chance, as when rock–paper–scissors is used to decide a matter.

== See also ==
- First-move advantage in chess – Advantage of White over Black in chess
- Real-time strategy – Strategy video game sub-genre
- Simultaneous game – Game class in game theory
