= Finger pulling =

Sport

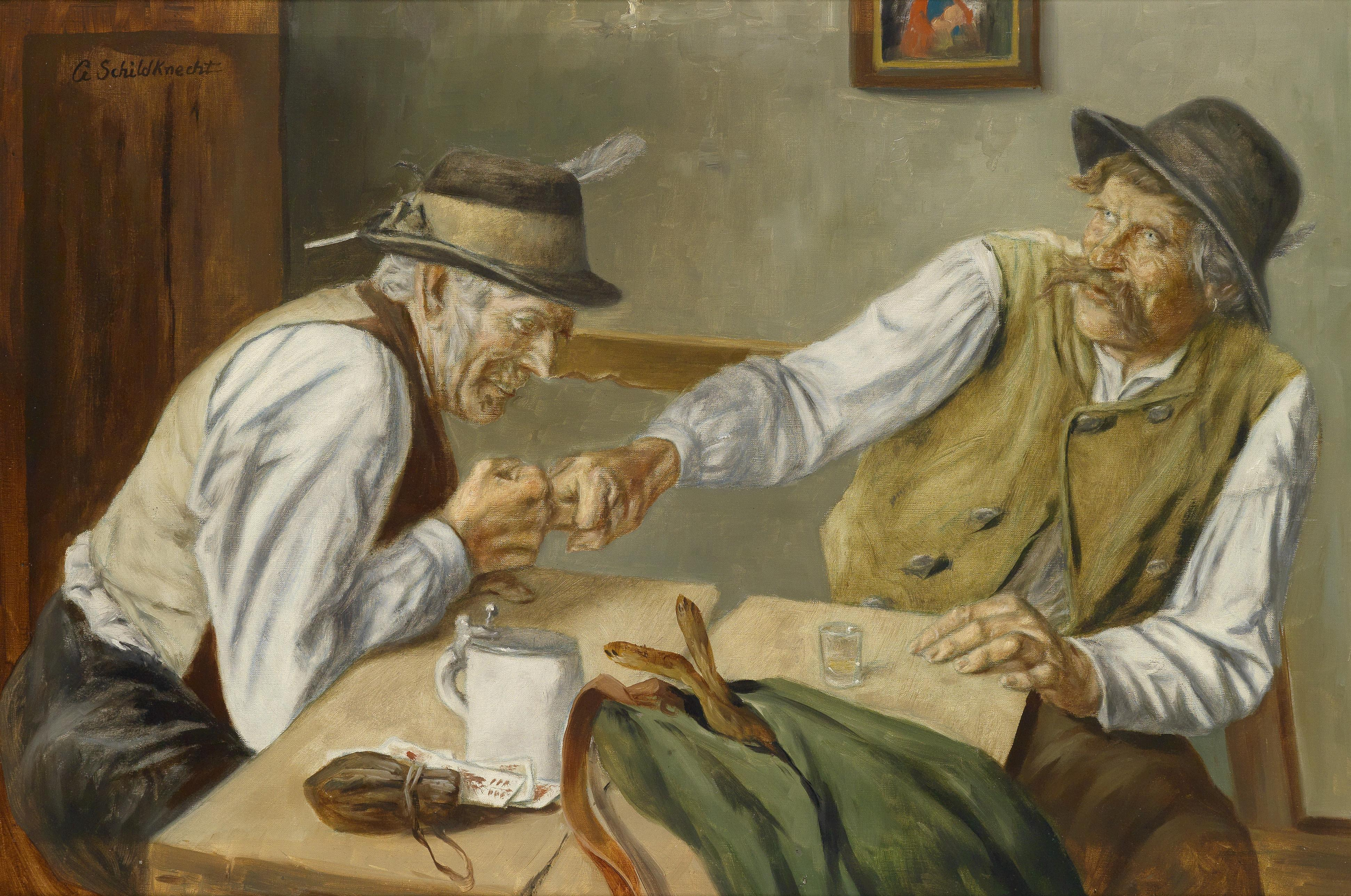
- Fingerhakeln in a painting by Georg Schildknecht.
- Nicknames: Fingerhakeln; Trække krog; Fingerkrok; Sormikoukku

Characteristics
- Contact: Semi-contact
- Team members: Individual
- Type: Combat sport
- Equipment: Table; Stools; Leather strap (optional)

Presence
- Country or region: Austria, Denmark, Finland, Germany, Norway, Sweden
- Olympic: No
- World Games: No

Finger pulling, regionally known as Fingerhakeln (German), Trække krog (Danish), Fingerkrok (Norwegian and Swedish), and Sormikoukku (Finnish) is a sport practiced in many regions, predominantly Bavaria, Austria, Scandinavia, and Finland.

== Rules ==
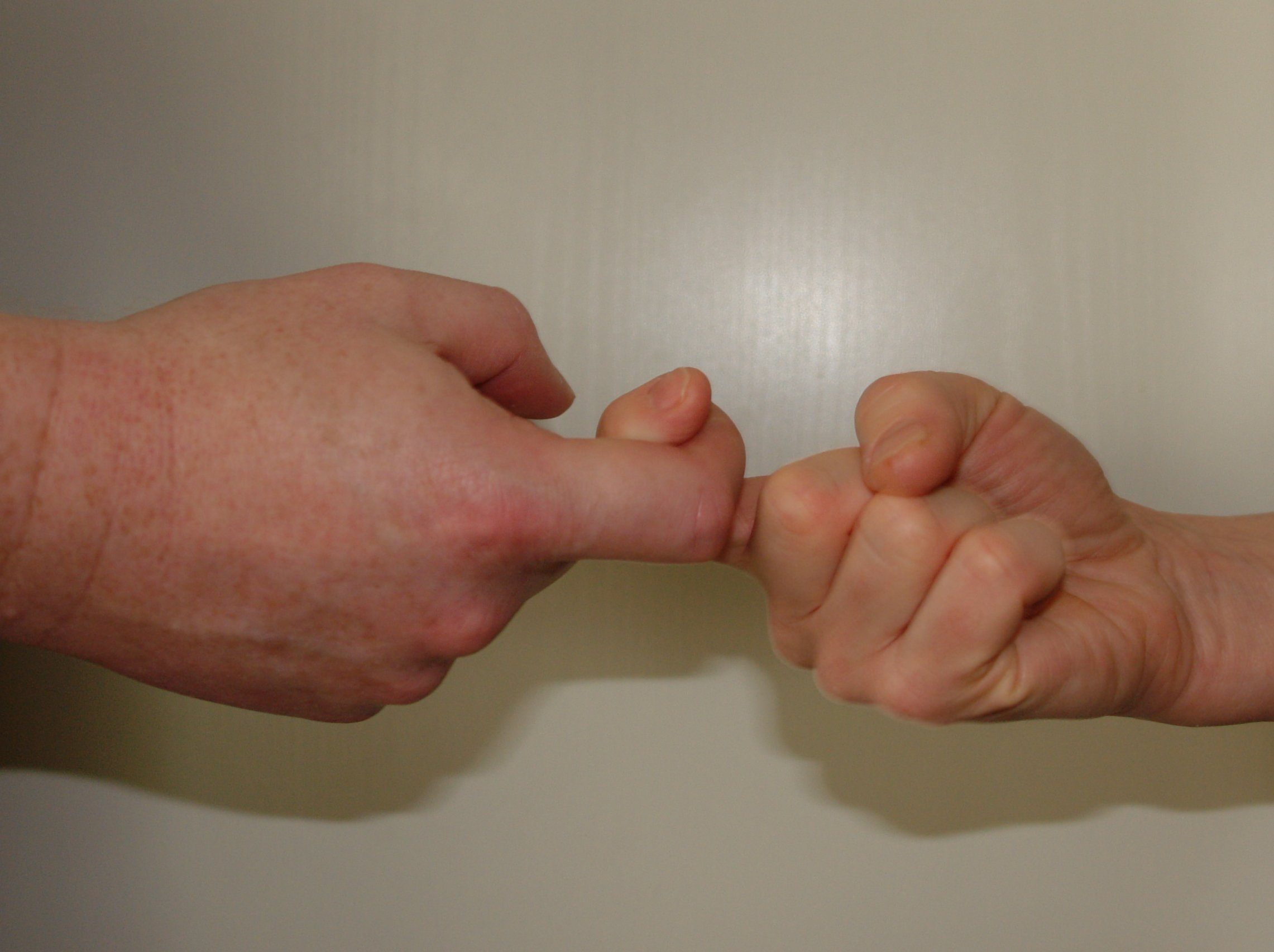
Fingerhakeln without strap

In finger pulling, the opponents sit on stools at a table opposite one another and try to pull the opponent towards themselves over the table using one finger. By physical force, overcoming the pain of the finger being stretched, and with appropriate technique, the opponent can be defeated. Any single finger is allowed in principle (but not the thumb), but usually the opponents hook their middle fingers in a leather strap. Sometimes, only the index fingers are hooked into each other without a strap. An Auffänger (catcher) sits behind each contestant to support their bodies if they lean very far back in the contest. Additionally, there is a referee, a chairman, and two assessors.

== History ==
Allegedly, disputes were settled by finger pulling in former times in countries of the Alps, and the sport was part of the athletic tradition before wide standardization took place.

In its present form, Fingerhakeln is an organized sport. Leather straps (about 10 cm long and 6 to 8 mm wide), table (79 cm high, 74 cm wide and 109 cm long), stools (40 by 40 cm, 48 cm high), and distance between the middle line and the sidelines (32 cm) are standardized. Every year, Bavarian, Austrian, German, and Alpine championships in different weight and age classes are held.

The German proverb Jemanden über den Tisch ziehen—literally "pull someone over the table", but with the meaning "to defeat, play off against someone"—has its origin in this popular sport in which not only force alone but especially technique can be decisive.
