= Morra (game) =

Hand game

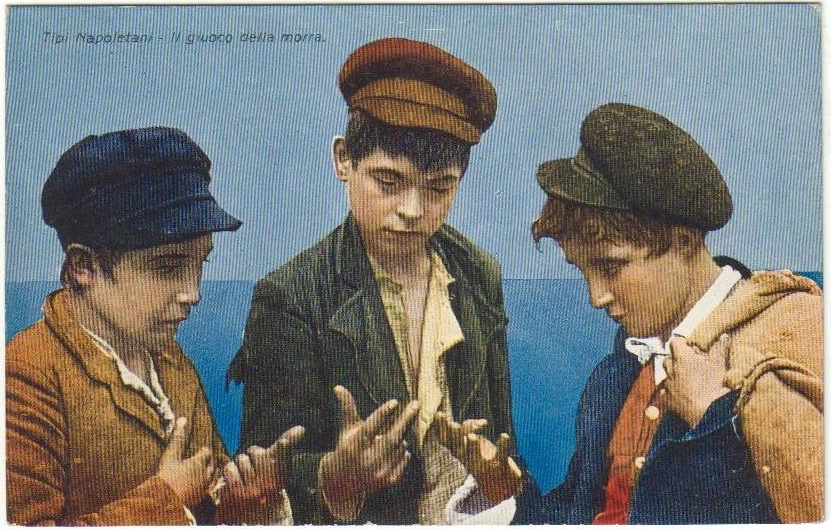
A postcard of boys playing Morra

Morra is a hand game that dates back thousands of years to ancient Roman and Greek times. Each player simultaneously reveals their hand, extending any number of fingers, and calls out a number. Any player who successfully guesses the total number of fingers revealed by all players combined scores a point.

Morra can be played to decide issues, much as two people might toss a coin, or for entertainment.

== Rules ==
While there are many variations of Morra, most forms can be played with a minimum of two players. In the most popular version, all players throw out a single hand, each showing zero to five fingers, and call out their guess at what the sum of all fingers shown will be. If one player guesses the sum, that player earns one point. The first player to reach three points wins the game.

Some variants of Morra involve money, with the winner earning an amount equal to the sum of fingers displayed.

== History ==
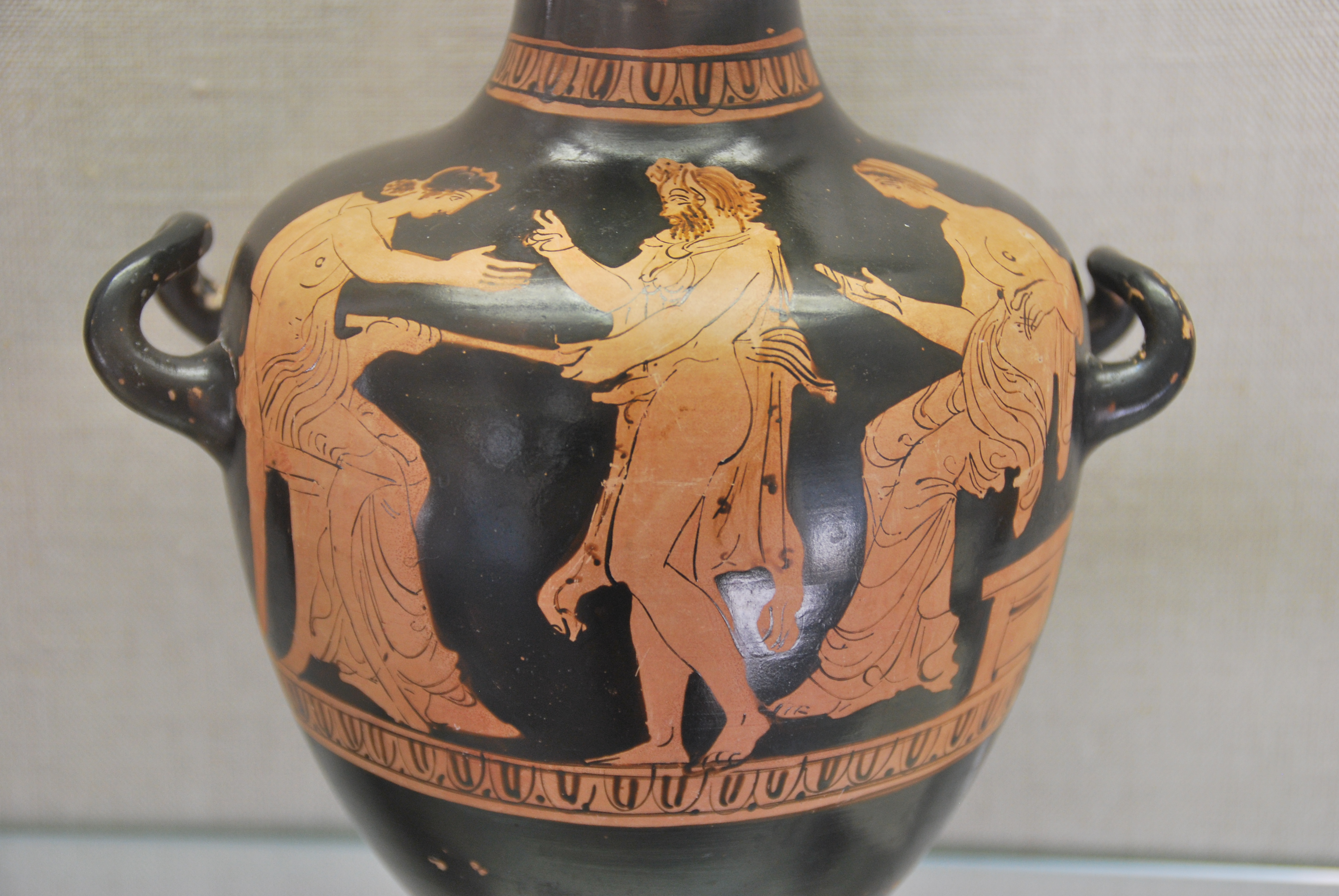
A maenad and a satyr play morra on a red-figure hydria of the 4th century BCE (Würzburg, Martin von Wagner Museum H 5341)

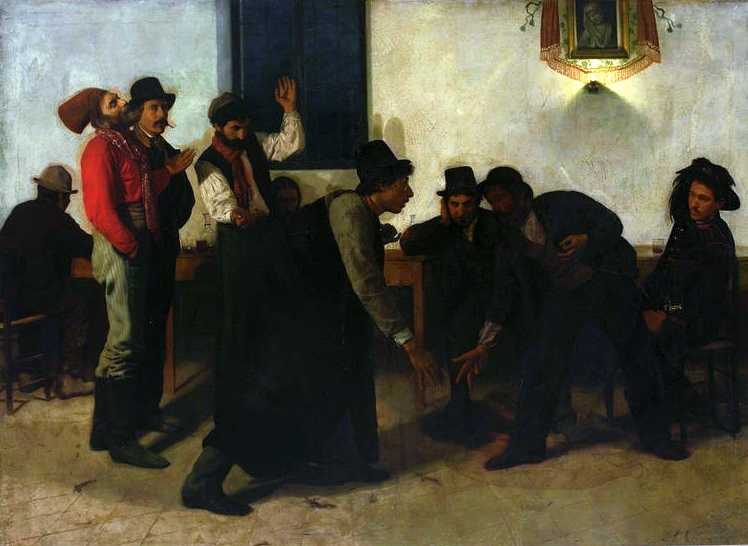
Morra players in Rome by Aleksander Gierymski (1874), National Museum in Warsaw

Morra was known to the ancient Romans and is popular around the world, especially in Italy. In ancient Rome, it was called micatio, and playing it was referred to as micare digitis; literally, "to flash with the fingers". As time passed, the name became morra, a corruption of the verb micare. The game was so common in ancient Rome that there was a proverb used to denote an honest person which referred to it: dignus est quicum in tenebris mices, literally, "he is a worthy man with whom you could play micatio in the dark". Micatio became so common that it came to be used to settle disputes over the sale of merchandise in the Roman forum. This practice was eventually banned by Apronius, prefect of the city. The game followed Roman colonists as they spread through Europe, the Near East, and North Africa. The game is also mentioned by Aristotle, but it seems that it has not been very common in Greece.

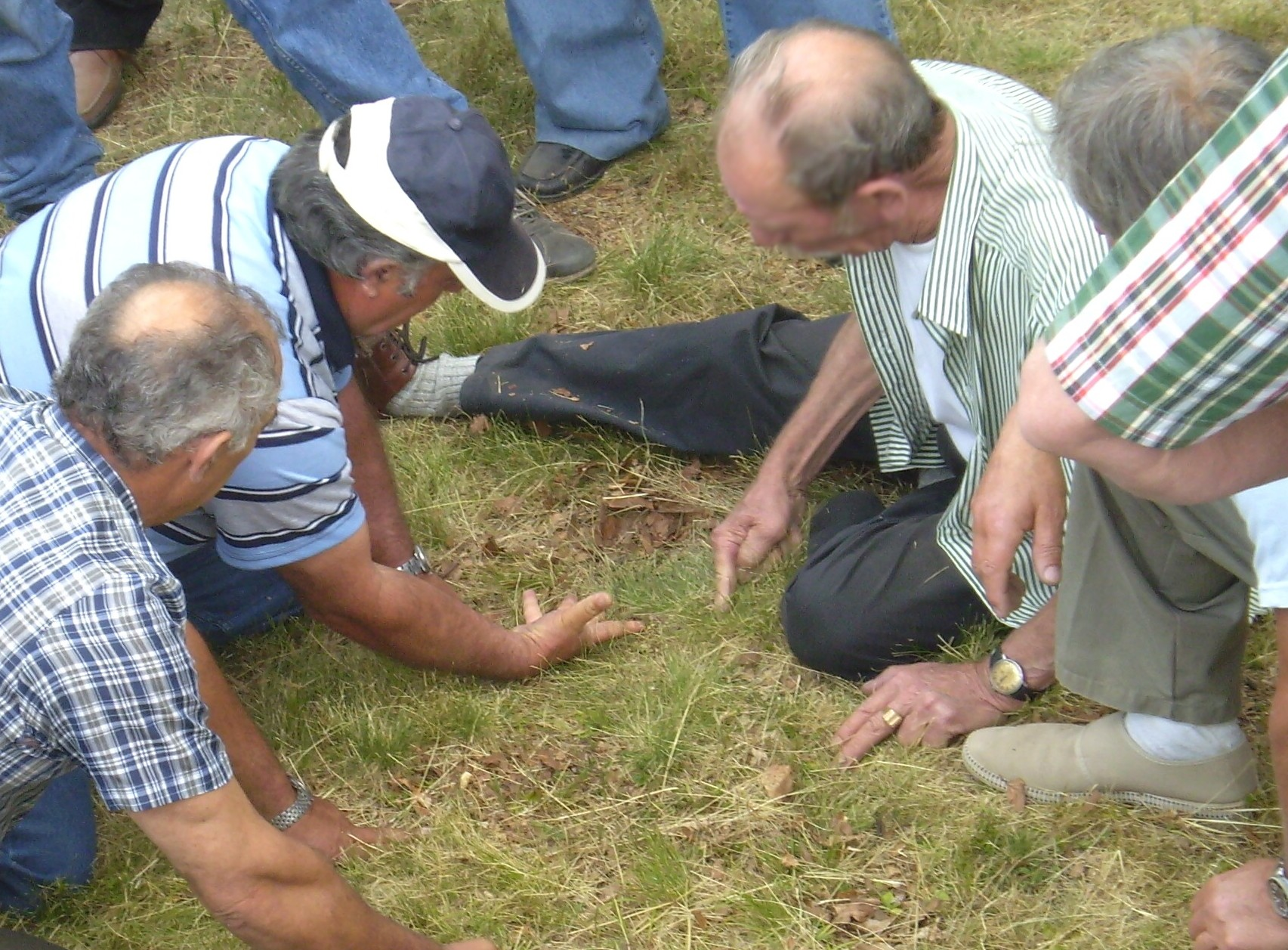
Morra players in Italy (2007)

Today, morra can be found throughout Italy (notably in Sardinia, where it is called sa murra), Greece, the Province of Teruel in Spain, Corsica, France, Portugal, Cyprus, Istria, Dalmatia, Herzegovina, and Malta. There is also a variant in Spain called "Chinos" where coins are used instead of fingers. Morra played in Arab countries is called mukharaja. In southern France, it is called la mourre, while in Istria, Dalmatia, and Herzegovina it is called šijavica.

In China and Mongolia similar games are played as a drinking game. In Mongolia, such games are known as дэмбээдэх (dembeedekh) and хуруудах (khuruudakh). Throughout China, it is known by many names such as: 猜拳 (cāi quán, caai1 kyun4) "guess fist", 划拳 / 嘩拳 (huá quán) "add up fist" or "shout fist", 猜枚 (cāi méi, caai1 mui4-2) "guess how many", 十五二十 (shíwǔ èrshí, sap6ng5 yi6sap6) "fifteen twenty", or 臆子 (ioh-chí) "guess".

It is also popular in South and North American communities with large Italian populations, sometimes known as "Little Italy" in their area. In the city of Hazleton, Pennsylvania, an annual tournament is held in February. Money raised during the tournament is given to a local charity associated with Helping Hands.

In New York City and Long Island in the 1950s, the game was called "chooses", and would be invoked to resolve a playground dispute by one antagonist saying, "let's shoot for it". In Boston at about the same time, the term in use was "bucking up". In US Coast Guard wardrooms (officers' mess), players "shake out". It has also been referred to as "odds-on poke".

In 2005, the IFC, short for Italian Fingers Championship, became an official tournament for a modified version of Morra that is played in teams.

The game of morra is described in the images in the Theban tombs of MK, Beni Hassan (tomb 9), and the 26th dynasty tomb of Aba (number 36).

In 2010 and 2014 A. Zizi, professor at the IT Giua high school of Cagliari, created, along with his students, a digital version of the Sardinian version of the game.

== Variants ==
The rules for morra can be altered in several ways.

=== Odds and evens ===
In this two-player version, one person is designated the "odds" player while the other is labeled "evens". Players hold one hand out in front of them and count together to three (sometimes chanting "Once, twice, thrice, shoot!" or "One, two, three, shoot!"). On "shoot", both players hold out either one or two fingers. If the sum of fingers shown by both players is an even number (i.e., two or four) then the "evens" player wins; otherwise the "odds" player is the winner. Since there are two possible ways to add up to three, both players have an equal chance of winning.

=== More fingers ===
One variant of the game is to allow players to hold out any number of fingers, with the winner still based on whether the resulting sum is odd or even. For example, if there are two players and they each throw out five fingers, the resulting summation is even, so the "evens" player is the winner. Note, since only the parity of the sum matters, there is no functional difference between using only 2 or 4 fingers, etc.

=== Micatio ===
Micatio is a variation of morra that attempts to lessen the element of chance by including the sight and speed of the player, a calculation of probabilities, and a certain psychological flair. In micatio the two players "each raise the fingers of the right hand, varying each time the number raised and the number kept down, and call aloud the total of the fingers raised by both", until one player wins the round by guessing correctly. Winning the round earns the player one point. If the numbers thrown do not match the numbers shouted, no point is scored.

Additionally:

1. Hands must be in clear view to players and referees.
2. One challenger cannot play after they see what the other has shown.
3. The point is won by the player who correctly guesses the sum of all fingers displayed.
4. If both players guess correctly, the point is unassigned and the game continues.
5. The set is won by the player who is first to score 16 points in the first and the return game, and 21 in the deciding one.
6. If both players tie the score when they miss a point to win, they play a 5-point tie-break.
7. The match is awarded to the winner of two out of three sets.
8. Players cannot challenge referees' decisions.
9. It is an individual game, but you can also play with a mate against two others, as they do in the Championships.
10. In such a case, two challengers start the game and the one who wins the point has the lead until they lose it.

Micatio is also played in competitions with four-person teams. Team members compete one at a time, facing their opponent. Each team member plays four times, and a match consists of eleven points.

Micatio is still popular today in southern Italy, and dates to Ancient Rome.

=== Ones-and-twos ===
Ones-and-twos is an elimination variant of the game, requiring more than two people. It is essentially a simplified version of rock–paper–scissors with only two choices. The loser is the "odd man out", or the minority choice in the case of large groups. For example: if there are ten players, and six happen to hold out two fingers while four hold out one finger, the four people holding one finger lose and are eliminated. The remaining six players move on to play another round. In this variant, the last round (between two players) is usually decided traditionally.

This version can be played with any number of people, and is usually faster and easier than dealing with three variable combinations, as it eliminates the need for round robin tournaments.

A popular variant is often used to gamble for coffee. The aim is to be a part of the minority and be eliminated. Rounds continue till two people remain and they then play rock–paper–scissors. The loser of the "showdown" then purchases coffees for all players. Depending on the rule set coffees can sometimes be substituted for food or other beverages of a similar, agreed upon value.

League tables are often created and a thorough statistical analysis is applied in an attempt to enhance play. However, the effect of such analysis on outcomes is disputed.

=== Modular arithmetic ===
The game can be expanded for a larger number of players by using modular arithmetic. For n players, each player is assigned a number from zero to n−1. On the count of three, each player holds out any number of fingers less than n, including zero. The person whose number is the remainder of the sum is chosen.

In this variant it is common to arrange all players in a circle, assign someone to be player zero, and assign numbers to other players counting upwards in a direction (usually clockwise). With this arrangement, once players throw out their numbers, they leave their hands in place and close their fingers one at a time as counting moves around the circle. When no fingers are left, the final player counted is selected.

=== Allowing zero ===
Some variants of morra allow players to hold out zero fingers. If the total number of fingers is also equal to zero, the game is usually counted as a draw and replayed.

=== Shish-Nu ===
Shish-Nu is a variation of Morra where the rules are to hold out fists and stick out your thumbs only. The game works best with a large number of players. The game is played by every player holding out their fists with no thumbs raised. Then, all players say "Shish-Nu" and then the number of thumbs they guess will be up. The number correlates to the number of players in the game as well.

=== Chin Chin ===
Chin Chin is a variant most closely related to Shish-Nu, the main difference being that Chin Chin is more turn-based. Chin Chin is most popular in the US.

To play Chin Chin players hold out their fists with no thumbs raised. Turns go clockwise around the group and the player whose turn it is shouts "Chin Chin" and a number. Immediately players put up a random number of thumbs. If the player correctly shouts the number of thumbs up in the group he wins the round and places a hand behind his back. This repeats and the person who is first to lose both hands wins.

=== Fifteen-Twenty ===
Fifteen-Twenty is an old Chinese variant of morra with numerous variations of its own played in different parts of Asia. Two players face off in this game with both of their hands in front of them, face-to-face. Players take turns guessing the number of total fingers that are shown each round. Players can hold out either two fists (0), a fist and an open hand (5), or two open hands (10). As such, the total number of fingers that can be guessed is 0, 5, 10, 15, or 20.

When a player makes a guess (a round), both players can change the number of fingers currently being held up. If the previous player made a wrong guess, the opponent can immediately start the new round and make a new guess without delay (sometimes catching the other player off guard before they are able to change their fingers). If a player guesses correctly, he immediately gets to guess again. Guessing correctly on the second try wins the game. If a player makes an impossible guess, (e.g. guessing 20 but only putting in a fist and a palm for 5 points) then that person gets a strike. Two strikes would result in a point for the other player.

== See also ==
- Chopsticks (hand game) - a hand-game based on logic rather than chance.
- Matching pennies - a game of chance, using coins instead of fingers.
- Rock paper scissors - a hand-game of chance, in which each player has three options.
- Spoof (game) - a game of chance, in which each player has to guess the total number of coins held by all players.
- Horsengoggle - a hand-game of chance, used to select a single person from a group.
- Liar's dice - similar game played using dice
