= Intuitive criterion =

In game theory, the intuitive criterion is a type of equilibrium refinement in signaling games. It aims to reduce possible outcome scenarios by restricting the possible sender types to types who could obtain higher utility levels by deviating to off-the-equilibrium messages, and to types for which the off-the-equilibrium message is not equilibrium dominated.

== Background ==
A signaling game is a game in which one player ("sender") has private information regarding his type. He sends a signal ("message") to the other player ("receiver") to indicate his type. The receiver then takes an action. Both the signal and the receiver action can affect both players' utilities. A perfect Bayesian equilibrium (PBE) in such a game consists of three elements.

- A sender strategy - a function from the sender type to a signal that maximizes this type's utility given the receiver strategy.
- A receiver belief - a function from the signal to a probability distribution over sender types; the belief must be consistent with the sender strategy in the sense of Bayes' rule.
- A receiver strategy - a function from the signal to an action which maximizes the receiver's utility given his belief.

The definition of PBE does, however, not impose any restrictions on the beliefs about signals that the sender never sends in equilibrium, since Bayes' rule is not applicable for events that occur with probability zero. Therefore, signaling games typically have a large number of equilibria that can be supported by an off-equilibrium belief. For example, it is possible to have a PBE with the following properties.

- The sender of all types only sends the same signal.
- The receiver believes that, if the sender did send a different signal, then the receiver would take an action that effectively "punishes" the sender by giving low utility to all types.
- There exists a belief such that the punishing action is optimal for the receiver.

While this satisfies the definition of PBE, the receiver belief might be "unreasonable". The intuitive criterion, like most refinement techniques, is based on restricting the beliefs off the equilibrium path.

== Explanation ==
The intuitive criterion was presented by In-Koo Cho and David M. Kreps in a 1987 article. Their idea was to try to reduce the set of equilibria by requiring off-equilibrium receiver beliefs to be reasonable in some sense.

Intuitively, we can eliminate a PBE if there exists a sender type who wants to deviate, assuming that the receiver has a reasonable belief. It is reasonable to believe that the deviating sender is of a type who would benefit from the deviation in at least the best-case scenario. If a type of sender could not benefit from the deviation even if the receiver changed his belief in the best possible way for the sender, then the receiver should reasonably put zero probability on the sender being of that type. The deviating sender type $\theta'$ could persuasively tell the receiver to interpret his deviating signal $m'$ favorably:

I am sending the message $m'$. Please re-think your belief. If you switch to a reasonable belief, then you will have to re-think what your optimal response action is. If sending this message so convinces you to change your response action, then, as you can see, it is in my interest to deviate to the signal $m'$.

== Formal definition ==
Formally, given any set of types $\Theta'\subseteq\Theta$, let $A^*(\Theta',m')$ denote the set of actions that are optimal for the receiver given some belief with support in $\Theta'$ and given the signal $m'$. Let $u_s(m,a,\theta)$ denote the sender utility as a function of her type $\theta$, her signal $m$, and the receiver action $a$. Given any PBE with sender strategy $m^*$ and receiver strategy $a^*$, the equilibrium payoff of any type $\theta$ is denoted $u_s^*(\theta) = u_s(m^*(\theta),a^*(m^*(\theta)),\theta)$. The set of types such that deviating to signal $m'$ can, in the best case, yield a weakly higher payoff than the equilibrium payoff is

$$\Theta^{**}(m')=\{ \theta \in \Theta | u_s^*(\theta) \leq \max_{a\in A^*(\Theta,m')} u_s(m',a,\theta)\}.$$

For types outside of this set, the signal $m'$ is called equilibrium dominated.

A particular PBE is eliminated by the intuitive criterion if there exists a sender type $\theta'$ and a deviating signal $m'$ that guarantees for this type a payoff above their equilibrium payoff as long as the receiver has a reasonable belief, that is, assigns zero probability to the deviation having been made by a type for whom $m'$ is equilibrium dominated. Formally,

$$\min_{a \in A^*(\Theta^{**}(m'),m')} \left[ u_s (m',a,\theta')\right] > u_s^*(\theta').$$

== Example ==
In the standard Spence signaling game, with two types of senders, a continuum of pooling equilibrium persist under solution concepts such as sequential equilibrium and perfect bayesian equilibrium. But the Cho-Kreps intuitive criterion eliminates all pooling equilibria. In the same game, there is also a continuum of separating equilibria, but the intuitive criterion eliminates all the separating equilibria except for the most efficient one -- the one where low-ability types are exactly indifferent between acquiring the amount of education that high-ability types do and not acquiring any education at all.

A sketch of a typical model shows why (this model is worked out more fully in signalling games). Suppose the abilities of low and high types of worker are 0 and 10, with equal probability, that in equilibrium the employer will pay the worker his expected ability, and that the cost of education $s$ is $s$ for high-ability workers and $2s$ for low-ability workers. There would be a continuum of separating equilibria with $s^*\in [5, 10]$ and of pooling equilibria with $s^* \in [0, 2.5]$. The intuitive criteria would rule out a separating equilibrium such as $s^*=6$ for the high type and $s=0$ for the low type because the high-ability worker could profitably deviate to, for example, $s=5.1$. That is because if the employer still believe the worker is high-ability, his payoff is higher than with $s=6$, receiving the same salary of 10 but paying less for education, while the low-ability worker does worse even if his deviation persuades employers that he has high ability, because although his wage would rise from 0 to 10, his signal cost would rise from 0 to 2*5.1. Thus, it is reasonable for the employer to believe that only a high-ability worker would ever switch to $s^*=5.1$. This argument applies to all separating equilibria with $s^*>5$.

The intuitive criterion also rules out all pooling equilibria. Consider the equilibrium in which both types choose $s^*=0$ and receive the expected ability of 5 as their wage. If a worker deviates to $s=4$ (for example), the intuitive criterion says that employers must believe he is the high type. That is because if they do believe, and he really is the high type, his payoff will rise from 5 - 0 = 5 to 10 - 4 = 6, but if he were the low type, his payoff would fall from 5 - 0 = 5 to 10 - 2*4 = 2. This argument can be applied to any of the pooling equilibria.

== See also ==
- Divine equilibrium
