= Hierarchy of beliefs =

Mathematical construct in game theory

The hierarchy of beliefs is a mathematical construct in game theory used to model incomplete information situations, where players are uncertain about other players' private information. Each player is modeled as having a privately known "type" that determines their preferences and beliefs, which in turn guide their strategic decisions. This approach builds upon John Harsanyi’s foundational work on games with incomplete information.

In this framework, a player's first-order beliefs are probability distributions over other players’ types. Second-order beliefs are beliefs about others’ first-order beliefs, and this recursive structure continues indefinitely, forming a hierarchy of beliefs.

Jean-François Mertens and Shmuel Zamir’s key contribution in 1985 was the construction of a universal type space—a mathematical structure encompassing all possible hierarchies of beliefs consistent with the model. This universal space enables a rigorous treatment of beliefs at all levels and provides a foundation for practical approximations using finite type spaces.

The concept has become central in Bayesian game theory, with applications in economics, computer science, AI, and philosophy. It is particularly useful in analyzing strategic interactions under asymmetric information and uncertainty, and in exploring notions like common knowledge, as formalized by Robert Aumann, and induction puzzles involving recursive reasoning.
