= Electronic mail game =

Incomplete-information coordination game

In game theory, the electronic mail game is an example of an "almost common knowledge" incomplete information game. It illustrates the apparently paradoxical situation where arbitrarily close approximations to common knowledge lead to very different strategical implications from that of perfect common knowledge. Intuitively, it shows that arbitrarily long but finite chains of "I know that you know that I know that you know..." are fundamentally different from infinite ones.

It was first introduced by Ariel Rubinstein in 1989.

== The game ==
=== Setup ===
The electronic mail game is a coordination game of incomplete information. Players 1 (she) and 2 (he) can choose between actions $A$ and $B$. There are two states of the world $a$ and $b$, which happen with respective probabilities $1-p$ and $p$, with $p < 1/2$. The payoffs for each action profile in each of those states are:

	$A$	$B$
$A$	$M$, $M$	$0$, $-L$
$B$	$-L$, $0$	$0$, $0$
State $a$

	$A$	$B$
$A$	$0$, $0$	$0$, $-L$
$B$	$-L$, $0$	$M$, $M$
State $b$

where $L > M > 0$. Players would like to coordinate to play $A$ in state of the world $a$, and to play $B$ in $b$. If they coordinate in the wrong state, they only get $0$ payoff; but if they choose different actions, the player who chose $B$ gets a negative payoff of $-L$.

Player 1 knows the true state of nature, whereas Player 2 does not. Without communicating, the highest expected payoff they can achieve is $(1-p)M$, by always choosing $A$. If the state of the world were common knowledge, both players would be able to achieve payoff $M$.

=== Email communication ===
Now assume that the players communicate via emails. Once Player 1 discovers the state of nature, her computer automatically sends an email to Player 2 informing him of the true state; Player 2's computer then automatically replies with a confirmation that he received the information; Player 1's computer then automatically replies with a confirmation that she received the information that he received the information, and so on. This mimics the idea of a "I know that you know that I know that you know..." chain.

However, there is an arbitrarily small probability $\varepsilon > 0$ that some technical failure will happen and one of those emails will not arrive at its destination, after which communication will cease. If that happens, the last player to send the message does not know if 1) the other player did not get the last message, or 2) the other player got the last message, but could not send the confirmation email due to the technical failure.

=== Types and strategies ===
Let $T_i$ be the number of messages that were sent by Player $i$'s computer — since that information is only observed by Player $i$, we can think of $T_i$ as their Harsanyi type. In terms of choice, players only observe $T_i \in \{1, 2, ..., \}$ and then must choose an action $\{A, B\}$. A strategy in the electronic mail game is thus defined as a function from $\mathbb N \ni T_i$ to $\{A, B\}$.

The distribution of types $(T_1, T_2)$ is given by the following probabilities $\mathbb P(T_1, T_2)$:

- $\mathbb P(0, 0) = 1-p$: the true state is $a$ and no email is sent
- $\mathbb P(n+1, n) = p \varepsilon(1-\varepsilon)^{2n}$: the true state is $b$ and the failure happens in Player 2's computer after Player 1 sent $n+1$ emails
- $\mathbb P(n+1, n+1) = p \varepsilon(1-\varepsilon)^{2n+1}$: the true state is $b$ and the failure happens in Player 1's computer after Player 1 sent $n+1$ emails

=== Equilibrium ===
The equilibrium concept to be used is that of a Bayesian Nash Equilibrium (BNE). Rubinstein showed that, no matter how small the chance of failure $\varepsilon$ and no matter how many confirmation emails were sent, both players always choose to play $A$, even if they know that the state of nature is $b$.

Proposition: There is only one BNE where Player 1 plays $A$ when the state of nature is $a$. In this equilibrium, both players play $A$, independently of their types.

The result is counterintuitive, since both know that the true state is $b$, and they can have arbitrarily precise knowledge of "knowing that the other player knows that they know that the other player knows..." that the state is $b$. Still, since this chain of information eventually stops, their equilibrium best response still is to always play $A$.
