= Lewis signaling game =

Type of signaling game

An extensive form representation of a two-person Lewis signalling game

In game theory, the Lewis signaling game is a type of signaling game that features perfect common interest between players. It is named for the philosopher David Lewis who was the first to discuss this game in his Ph.D. dissertation, and later book, Convention.

== The game ==
The underlying game has two players, the sender and the receiver. The world can be in any of a number of states and the sender is aware of that state. The sender has at its disposal a fixed set of signals that it can send to the receiver. The receiver can observe the signal sent, but not the state of the world, and must take some action. For each state, there is a unique correct action and both the sender and receiver prefer that the receiver take the correct action in every state. Because both the sender and receiver prefer the same outcomes as one another, this game is a game of perfect common interest.

The simplest version of this game (pictured above) has two states, two signals, and two acts.

== Equilibria ==
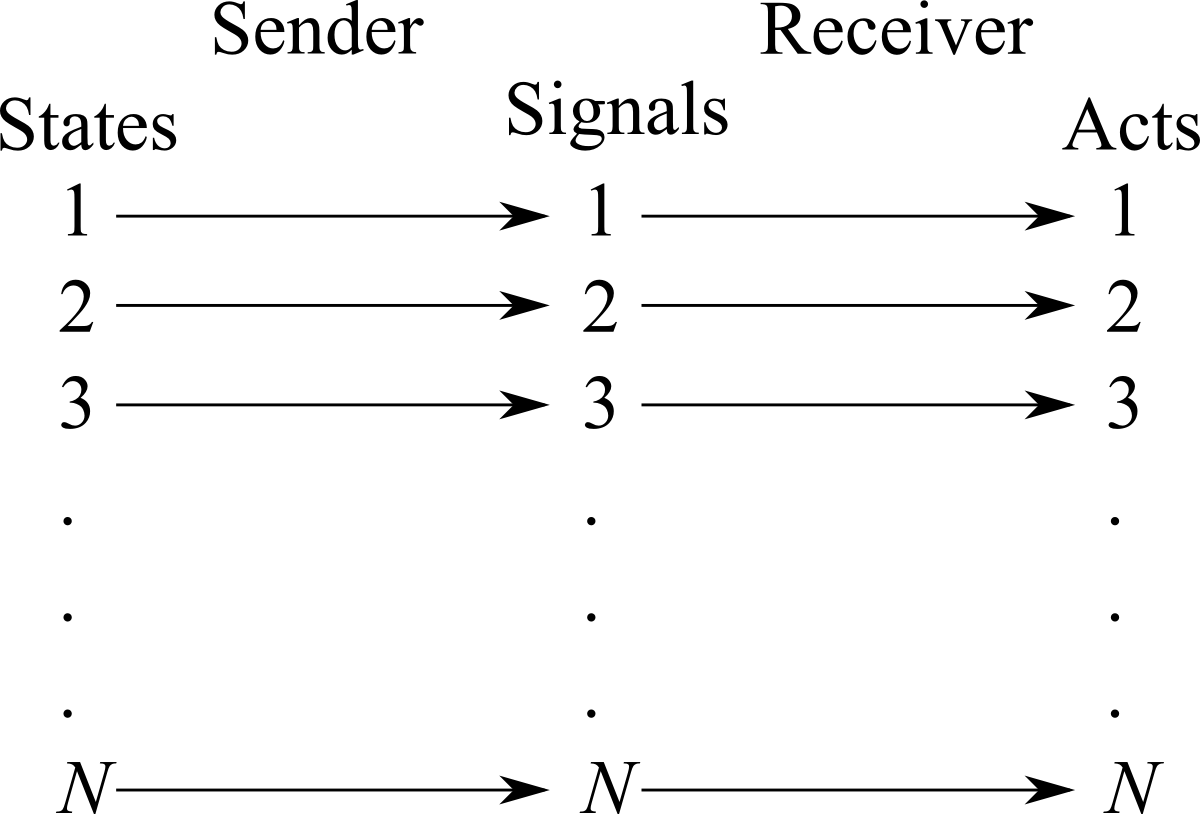
A signaling system equilibrium

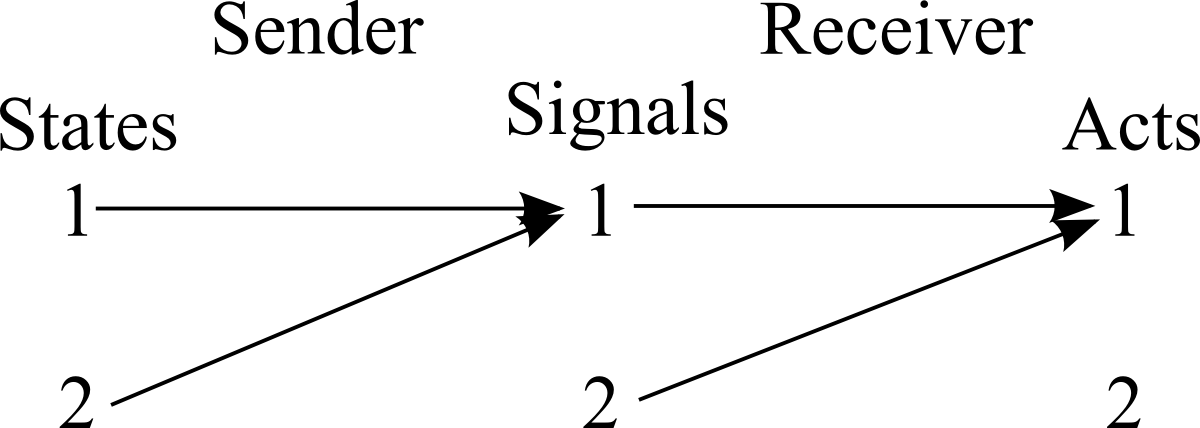
A pooling equilibrium

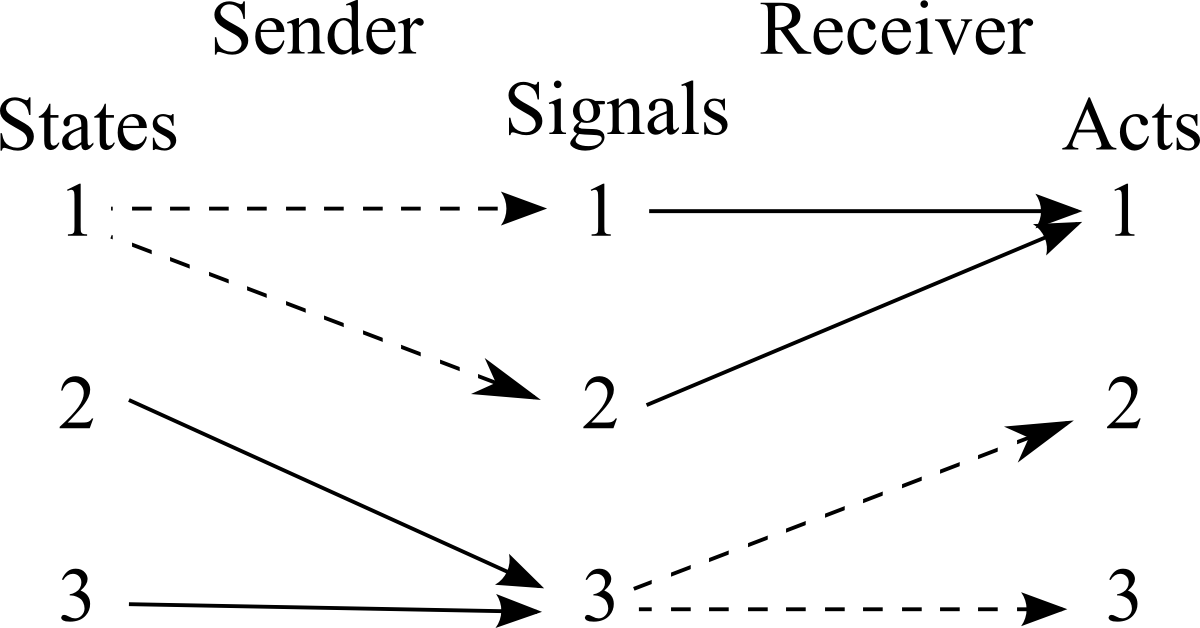
A partial pooling equilibrium, dotted lines represent mixed strategies.

This game has many Nash equilibria. A few of them stand out where the sender sends a different signal in each state and the receiver takes the appropriate action in every state. Lewis dubbed these signaling systems. But there are also other equilibria. In some the sender sends the same signal in every state and the receiver takes the action that is best to take given no additional information about the state of the world (pooling equilibria).

Also, when there are more than two states, signals, and acts, there are partial pooling equilibria where some information is conveyed, but some states are also pooled.
