= Divine equilibrium =

- Solution concept in game theory

Relationship
- Subset of: Perfect Bayesian equilibrium

Significance
- Proposed by: Jeffrey S. Banks and Joel Sobel
- Example: Signaling games

The Divine Equilibrium is a refinement of Perfect Bayesian equilibrium in a signaling game proposed by Banks and Sobel (1987). One of the most widely-applied refinements is the D_{1}-Criterion.

It is a restriction of receiver's beliefs to the type of senders for whom deviating towards an off-the-equilibrium message could improve their outcome compared to the equilibrium payoff. In addition to the restriction suggested by the intuitive criterion, the divinity criterion considers only those types which are most likely to send the off-the-equilibrium message.

If more than one sender could benefit from the deviation, the Intuitive Criterion assigns equal probabilities for all the senders, whereas the D_{1}-Criterion considers different probabilities.

== Example ==
The following example is adapted from the original Banks and Sobel (1987).

Consider a case of sequential settlement. The defendant (sender of messages) has two types: t_{1} and t_{2}. Type t_{1} is not negligent and type t_{2} is negligent. The defendant can offer a high settlement or low settlement (messages) to the plaintiff. The plaintiff (receiver of messages) can either accept or reject the settlement offer. The payoff is illustrated below.

Low settlement
plaintiff defendant	Accept offer	Reject offer
t_{1}	-3,3	-6,0
t_{2}	-3,3	-11,5

High settlement
plaintiff defendant	Accept offer	Reject offer
t_{1}	-5,5	-6,0
t_{2}	-5,5	-11,5

Here the payoff shows that if the plaintiff accepts the high settlement, the money transfer is larger (5 instead of 3 in the low settlement case). If the plaintiff rejects the offer, then the negligent type t_{2} receives a higher penalty from the court (-11 comparing with -6 for type t_{1}). However, since the plaintiff does not know the type, he is better off to accept the settlement when the defendant is not negligent.

Consider the prior probability to be half and half, meaning that before seeing the settlement offer the plaintiff believes that with 50 percent of the probability that the defendant is negligent. In this case, the game has two pooling equilibria. The first equilibrium (E1) is that both types of defendant choose a low settlement, and the plaintiff accepts the offer. The second equilibrium (E2) is that both types of defendant choose a high settlement, and the plaintiff accepts the offer. However, in order to support these equilibria, one also has to specify what are the beliefs if the plaintiff sees a different type of offer (commonly referred as off-equilibrium messages).

From the payoff matrix we can see that under E1, the defendant is already getting his highest possible payoff (-3). Thus, regardless of what the plaintiff thinks, the defendant does not have incentive to deviate. This reasoning is not true if the equilibrium is E2. The idea of equilibrium refinement is indeed to provide a reasonable argument to select the most "intuitive" outcome.

To see how the refinement works, we first need to check what kind of beliefs can support E2. In this case, in order for the defendant not to have incentive to deviate to low settlement, the plaintiff has to respond with "Reject" if he sees a low settlement, which translates into that the plaintiff has to have a belief that the defendant is negligent (type t_{2}) with probability larger than 60 percent (if this is true, then "accept" gives the plaintiff a payoff of 3, and "reject" gives the plaintiff a payoff of slightly more than 3=5*60%). Implicitly, the belief says that type t_{2} is more likely to deviate than t_{1}. The D_{1} criterion (or the more advanced version of divinity) is built on the idea of deciding which type is actually more likely to deviate.

If we look again at the payoff matrix under the low settlement case, then regardless of how the plaintiff assigns his probability of choosing "accept" or "reject", the payoff for type t_{1} is higher than type t_{2} (for example, if the plaintiff plays a strategy of choosing equally between "accept" and "reject", then type t_{1} gets -4.5, whereas type t_{2} gets -7). Thus, comparing with the equilibrium payoff of -5 under E2, one can argue that whenever t_{2} wants to deviate, type t_{1} also wants to deviate. Thus, a reasonable belief should assign a higher probability to type t_{1}. The D_{1} criterion pushes this type of reasoning to the extreme and requires that the plaintiff believes that the deviation (if observed) should come from t_{1}. As a result, E2 is not plausible because it contradicts with the refinement.
