= Vincent Crawford =

American economist (born 1950)

Vincent P. Crawford
- Born: 1950 (age 75–76); Springfield, Ohio, US

Academic background
- Education: Princeton University; Massachusetts Institute of Technology
- Thesis: Essays in Economic Theory
- Doctoral advisor: Franklin M. Fisher
- Influences: Albert W. Tucker

Academic work
- Discipline: Economics
- Sub-discipline: Game theory, experimental economics
- Institutions: University of Oxford; University of California, San Diego
- Website: econweb.ucsd.edu/~v2crawford/

Vincent P. Crawford FBA (born 1950) is an American economist. He is a senior research fellow at the University of Oxford, following his tenure as Drummond Professor of Political Economy from 2010 to 2020. He is also research professor at the University of California, San Diego.

== Early life and education ==
Crawford majored in economics at Princeton University, graduating Summa cum laude in 1972. He went on to further study at the Massachusetts Institute of Technology and received his PhD in economics in 1976. His thesis was supervised by Franklin M. Fisher.

== Career ==
Crawford began his academic career at the UCSD as assistant professor in 1976 and was promoted to full professor in 1985. As he took up his second professorship at Oxford University and the associated fellowship at All Souls College, Oxford in 2010, he was appointed Distinguished Professor Emeritus and research professor at UCSD.

The Econometric Society conferred fellowship to him in 1990, American Academy of Arts and Sciences elected him fellow in 2003, and the British Academy and the Society for the Advancement of Economic Theory followed suit in 2011 and 2012, respectively. He gave the 2017 Nancy L. Schwartz Memorial Lecture.

He has served as an editor and coeditor of various economic journals, such as Econometrica from 2004 to 2007, the American Economic Review from 2005 to 2009 and Games and Economic Behaviour.

== Research ==
Crawford's research focuses on behavioural game theory, specifically bargaining and communication, experimental economics and matching. His work on strategic information transmission has been seminal in the field of strategic communication in economic games, with his 1982 paper (co-authored with Joel Sobel) establishing the concept of cheap talk in game theory. The Economist predicted him to be the next Nobel Prize laureate in 2011.

== Selected works ==
- Crawford, Vincent P.; Sobel, Joel (1982). "Strategic Information Transmission". Econometrica. 50 (6): 1431–1451. doi:10.2307/1913390. JSTOR 1913390.
- Kelso, Alexander S.; Crawford, Vincent P. (1982). "Job Matching, Coalition Formation, and Gross Substitutes". Econometrica. 50 (6): 1483–1504. doi:10.2307/1913392. JSTOR 1913392.
- Crawford, Vincent P. (2003). "Lying for Strategic Advantage: Rational and Boundedly Rational Misrepresentation of Intentions". American Economic Review. 93: 133–149. doi:10.1257/000282803321455197. S2CID 16151864.
- Costa-Gomes, Miguel A.; Crawford, Vincent P. (2006). "Cognition and Behavior in Two-Person Guessing Games: An Experimental Study". American Economic Review. 96 (5): 1737–1768. doi:10.1257/aer.96.5.1737. hdl:11094/13895.
- Crawford, Vincent P.; Iriberri, Nagore (2007). "Fatal Attraction: Salience, Naïveté, and Sophistication in Experimental "Hide-and-Seek" Games". American Economic Review. 97 (5): 1731–1750. doi:10.1257/aer.97.5.1731. S2CID 1074610.
- Crawford, Vincent P. (2021). "Efficient mechanisms for level-k bilateral trading". Games and Economic Behavior. 127: 80–101. doi:10.1016/j.geb.2021.02.005. S2CID 26340336.
- Crawford, Vincent (1983). Essays in Economic Theory (Routledge Revivals). Oxford: Routledge. ISBN 978-1138858671.
