= Nancy L. Schwartz Memorial Lecture =

The Nancy L. Schwartz Memorial Lecture is a series of public lectures held every year by the Kellogg Department of Managerial Economics and Decision Sciences of Northwestern University.

Nancy Lou Schwartz was the Morrison Professor of Decision Sciences. She was also the Kellogg School's first female faculty member appointed to an endowed chair. Schwartz became a part of Kellogg in 1970, chaired MEDS as well as served as director of the school's doctoral program until her death in 1981. To date, sixteen out of the thirty-four speakers held or have gone on to win a Nobel Memorial Prize in Economic Sciences.

== Lectures ==
=== 1983 - 1989 ===
- Reinhard Selten (Nobel Laureate 1994). Evolution, Learning, and Economic Behavior.
- Truman F. Bewley. Knightian Uncertainty.
- Robert E. Lucas, Jr.,(Nobel Laureate 1995). On the Mechanics of Economic Development.
- Robert J. Aumann (Nobel Laureate 2005). Cooperation, Rationality, and Bounded Reality.
- Menachem E. Yaari. On the Role of 'Dutch Books' in the Theory of Choice Under Risk.
- Andreu Mas-Colell. On the Theory of Perfect Competition.
- Hugo Sonnenschein. The Economics of Incentives: An Introductory Account.

=== 1990 - 1999 ===
- Joseph E. Stiglitz. (Nobel Laureate 2001). The Theory of Bankruptcy in Modern Capitalism.
- Ariel Rubinstein. Topics in Language and Economics.
- David M. Kreps. Anticipated Utility and Dynamic Choice.
- Nancy L. Stokey. Shirtsleeves to Shirtsleeves: The Economics of Social Mobility.
- Roy Radner. Economic Survival.
- Robert B. Wilson (Nobel Laureate 2020). Negotiation With Private Information: Litigation and Strikes.
- Peter A. Diamond (Nobel Laureate 2010). Issues in Social Insurance.
- Kenneth J. Arrow (Nobel Laureate 1972). Information and Returns to Scale.
- Gary S. Becker (Nobel Laureate 1992). On Habits, Addictions, and Traditions.
- Vernon L. Smith (Nobel Laureate 2002). Experimental Economics: Behavioral Lessons for Theory and Microeconomic Policy.

=== 2000 - 2009 ===
- Drew Fudenberg. Learning in Games.
- Roger B. Myerson (Nobel Laureate 2007). On the Foundations of Social Institutions.
- Matthew Jackson. Social Structure, Segregation, and Economic Behavior.
- Robert C. Merton. (Nobel Laureate 1997). How to Pursue Both Comparative Advantage and Efficient Diversification of Risk: An Application of Derivative Securities.
- John O. Ledyard. Information Markets.
- Daniel Kahneman (Nobel Laureate 2002). Psychology and Behavioral Economics.
- Bengt R. Holmstrom (Nobel Laureate 2016). Corporate Governance.
- Eric R. Maskin (Nobel Laureate 2007). How to Reduce Greenhouse Gas Emissions: An Application of Auction Theory.
- David Baron. Private Politics.
- Oliver Hart (Nobel Laureate 2016). Financial Contracting.

=== 2010 - 2019 ===
- Vincent P. Crawford. Puffery, Trickery, Rendezvous, and Reassurance: Nonequilibrium Models of Strategic Communication.
- Paul Milgrom (Nobel Laureate 2020). Prices and Auctions in Markets with Complex Constraints.
- Ehud Kalai. Chaos, Learning and Stability in Big Games.
- Colin Camerer. When Game Theory Predicts Surprisingly Well, and Why.
- Hal Varian. Predicting the Present with Search Engine Data.
- Jean Tirole (Nobel Laureate 2014). Laws and Norms.
- K. Daron Acemoglu (Nobel Laureate 2024). Why Nations Fail.
- Al Roth (Nobel Laureate 2012). Market Design.
- Susan Athey. Marketplaces, Intermediaries, and Product Quality.
- Stephen Morris. Taking Incomplete Information Seriously: The Misunderstanding of John Harsanyi.

=== 2020 - 2029 ===
- Avinash Dixit. Community-Based Organizations to Combat Corruption. (postponed)
- Philippe Aghion (Nobel Laureate 2025). Rethinking Capitalism Post-Covid: The Power of Creative Destruction.
- Dilip Abreu. Bargaining and Cooperation in Dynamic Games
- Darrell Duffie. The Resilience of the US Treasury Market
- Douglas Diamond. The Long and Short of Financial Development.
