= Nancy Lou Schwartz =

American economist (1939–1981)

- Born: March 27, 1939; Fort Wayne, Indiana
- Died: December 7, 1981 (aged 42)

Academic background
- Education: Oberlin College; Purdue University
- Thesis: Economic Transportation Fleet Composition and Scheduling, with Special Reference to Inland Waterway Transport (1964)
- Doctoral advisor: Charles Warren Howe; Stanley Reiter

Academic work
- Institutions: Carnegie Mellon University; Northwestern University

Nancy Lou Schwartz (March 27, 1939 – December 7, 1981) was an American economist and professor who researched decision sciences and methods of dynamic optimization.

== Life and career ==
Schwartz earned her AB at Oberlin College (Phi Beta Kappa) in 1960 and attended graduate school at Purdue University, where she received her MS (1962) and PhD (1964). While at Purdue, one of her classmates was fellow economist Morton I. Kamien with whom she would publish many academic works.

Beginning in 1964, Schwartz taught at Carnegie Mellon University in Pittsburgh where she was a tenured associate professor and had been awarded a Ford Foundation Faculty Research Fellowship. In 1970, she accepted a position as a full professor at Northwestern University where she would remain for the rest of her life. From 1977 to 1979 she chaired the Northwestern Department of Managerial Economics and Decision Sciences and headed its PhD program. In 1981, she received the appointment to be the Morrison Professor of Managerial Economics and Decision Sciences and was director of the graduate studies program at the Kellogg Graduate School of Management. With her appointment, she became the first female faculty member appointed to an endowed chair at the Kellogg School.

In addition to her university duties, Schwartz served on the Council of The Institute of Management Sciences (1974–1976) and on the editorial board of the American Economic Review from 1981, and she was an associate editor of Econometrica from 1981.

Schwartz died in 1981 by suicide without leaving a note.

=== Dynamic optimization ===
Schwartz's PhD dissertation, supervised by Chuck Howe and Stan Reiter, researched "a problem of determining the routing and timing of movements of barges and towboats to carry out given freight movements between pairs of ports at minimal cost. She developed a linear discrete programming problem of this dynamic optimization problem, and was able to solve it for moderate problems."

Her later research fell into two related areas: methods of dynamic optimization, with a particular focus on application, and the effect of industry structure on technological innovation. Schwartz published research on other topics as well. She published in the field of control theory, or dynamic optimization, in the book Dynamic Optimization (1981, with Morton I. Kamien). She wrote about her research in technological innovation in many journal articles and also authored a second book with Kamien, Market Structure and Innovation (1982).

She is remembered for her "preference for problems related to application, and for hard (as opposed to soft) analysis, for which she had a considerable talent. Her work and personality had a strong effect on her students, many of whom became active research contributors in Economics and Management Science."

=== Memorial lectures ===
The Nancy L. Schwartz Memorial Lecture series is a series of public lectures held annually by the Kellogg Department of Managerial Economics and Decision Sciences at Northwestern. The series was created in Schwartz's memory by her family, colleagues and friends, and its speakers present topics of fundamental importance to current economic theory. As of 2020, 16 out of the 34 speakers held or have gone on to win a Nobel Memorial Prize in Economic Sciences.

== Selected publications ==
Schwartz published more than 40 papers and co-authored two books.

- Kamien, M. I., & Schwartz, N. L. (1968). Optimal "induced" technical change. Econometrica: Journal of the Econometric Society, 1–17.
- Kamien, M. I., & Schwartz, N. L. (1971). Sufficient conditions in optimal control theory. Journal of Economic Theory, 3(2), 207–214.
- Kamien, M. I., & Schwartz, N. L. (1975). Market structure and innovation: A survey. Journal of economic literature, 13(1), 1–37.
- Kamien, M. I., & Schwartz, N. L. (1974). Patent life and R and D rivalry. The American Economic Review, 64(1), 183–187.
- Kamien, M. I., & Schwartz, N. L. (1977). Optimal Capital Accumulation and Durable Goods Production. Zeitschrift Für Nationalökonomie / Journal of Economics, 37(1/2), 25–43. JSTOR 41797867
- Kamien, M. I., & Schwartz, N. L. (1978). Self-Financing of an R and D Project. The American Economic Review, 68(3), 252–261.
- Kamien, M. I., & Schwartz, N. L. (1978). Optimal exhaustible resource depletion with endogenous technical change. The Review of Economic Studies, 45(1), 179–196.
- Kamien, M. I., Schwartz, N. L., & Dolbear, F. T. (1966). Asymmetry between bribes and charges. Water Resources Research, 2(1), 147–157.
- Kamien, M. I., & Schwartz, N. L. (1982). Market structure and innovation. Cambridge University Press. (book)
