= Screening game =

Game class in game theory

A screening game is a two-player principal–agent type game used in economic and game theoretical modeling. Principal–agent problems are situations where there are two players whose interests are not necessarily matching with each other, and where complete honesty is not optimal for one player. This will lead to strategies where the players exchange information based in their actions which is to some degree noisy. This ambiguity prevents the other player from taking advantage of the first. The game is closely related to signaling games, but there is a difference in how information is exchanged.

In the principal-agent model, for instance, there is an employer (the principal) and a worker (the agent). The worker has a given skill level, and chooses the amount of effort he will exert. If the worker knows his ability (which is given at the outset, perhaps by nature), and can acquire credentials or somehow signal that ability to the employer before being offered a wage, then the problem is signaling. What sets apart a screening game is that the employer offers a wage level first, at which point the worker chooses the amount of credentials he will acquire (perhaps in the form of education or skills) and accepts or rejects a contract for a wage level. It is called screening, because the worker is screened by the employer in that the offers may be contingent on the skill level of the worker.

Some economists use the terms signaling and screening interchangeably, and the distinction can be attributed to Stiglitz and Weiss (1989).

== See also ==
- Cheap talk
- Game theory
- Incomplete information
- Signalling (economics)
- Signalling theory
