= Morton Kamien =

Polish-American economist

Morton I. Kamien
- Born: August 15, 1938; Poland
- Died: November 18, 2011 (aged 73); Evanston, Illinois, US

Academic background
- Education: City College of New York; Purdue University

Academic work
- Discipline: Mathematical economics
- Institutions: Northwestern University

Morton Isaac Kamien (August 15, 1938 – November 18, 2011) was an American economist notable for his contributions in industrial organization and mathematical economics. He was a professor of entrepreneurship at Northwestern University’s Kellogg School of Management from 1970 to 2007.

Born to Jewish parents in Poland, Kamien and his family escaped the Warsaw Ghetto before it was razed in 1944. Together with his father, Kamien moved to Munich, Bavaria, and finally immigrated to the United States in 1947, arriving in New York City. As his father struggled to regain a footing, Morton Kamien stayed in an orphanage in Far Rockaway, Queens.

Having financed his studies by selling clothing, Kamien graduated from City College of New York in 1960, and then pursued a PhD in economics from Purdue University, where Nancy Lou Schwartz and Hugo F. Sonnenschein were among his classmates. After his PhD in 1964, he first joined faculty at Carnegie Mellon University, before moving to Northwestern where he stayed until his retirement in 2007.

Kamien also acted as an expert witness in several high-profile antitrust cases, including Conwood vs. U.S. Tobacco and American Express vs. Visa/Mastercard, leading to the largest antitrust jury award ($1.05 billion) and antitrust settlement ($4.1 billion) to date.

== Selected publications ==
- Kamien, M. I. (1964). An econometric study of structural changes in the composition of the labor force, with special reference to the railroads. Purdue University. (book)
- Kamien, M. I., & Schwartz, N. L. (1975). Market structure and innovation: A survey. Journal of economic literature, 13(1), 1-37.
- Kamien, M. I., & Schwartz, N. L. (1976). On the degree of rivalry for maximum innovative activity. The Quarterly Journal of Economics, 90(2), 245–260.
- Kamien, M. I., & Schwartz, N. L. (1978). Self-Financing of an R and D Project. The American Economic Review, 68(3), 252–261.
- Kamien, M. I., & Schwartz, N. L. (1982). Market structure and innovation. Cambridge University Press. (book)
