= Joel Sobel =

American economist

Joel Sobel (born 24 March 1954) is an American economist and currently professor of economics at the University of California, San Diego. His research focuses on game theory and has been seminal in the field of strategic communication in economic games. His work with Vincent Crawford established the game-theoretic concept of cheap talk.

== Education ==
Sobel graduated with a B.S. in mathematics from the University of Michigan, in 1974. He went on to further study at the University of California, Berkeley, where he received an M.A. in economics and Ph.D. in applied mathematics in 1978.

== Career ==
The University of California, San Diego (UCSD) appointed Sobel assistant professor of economics upon graduation from Berkeley. He was promoted to associate professor in 1984 and full professor in 1988, a year after receiving a Sloan Foundation Fellowship. He was awarded a Guggenheim Fellowship in 2006.

He has served in an editorial capacity for a range of academic journals. He was associate editor of the Journal of Mathematical Economics, the Journal of Economic Theory, the Journal of Economic Literature, Games and Economic Behaviour and other publications. He served as co-editor of the American Economic Review from 2009 to 2010 and editor of Econometrica from 2015 to 2019.

== Honors ==
- Fellow of the Econometric Society in 1990
- Member of the Game Theory Society in 1998
- Fellow of the American Academy of Arts and Sciences in 2010
- Fellow of the Economic Theory Society in 2011

== Selected works ==
- Crawford, Vincent P.; Sobel, Joel (1982). "Strategic Information Transmission". Econometrica. 50 (6): 1431–1451. doi:10.2307/1913390. JSTOR 1913390.
- Banks, Jeffrey S.; Sobel, Joel (1987). "Equilibrium Selection in Signaling Games". Econometrica. 55 (3): 647–661. doi:10.2307/1913604. JSTOR 1913604.
- Sobel, Joel (2002). "Can We Trust Social Capital?". Journal of Economic Literature. 40: 139–154. doi:10.1257/0022051027001.
- Gneezy, Uri; Kajackaite, Agne; Sobel, Joel (2018). "Lying Aversion and the Size of the Lie". American Economic Review. 108 (2): 419–453. doi:10.1257/aer.20161553. hdl:2434/934356. S2CID 23181793.
- Sobel, Joel (2020). "Lying and Deception in Games". Journal of Political Economy. 128 (3): 907–947. doi:10.1086/704754. S2CID 23262279.
