= Separating equilibrium =

Type of perfect Bayesian equilibrium

In signaling games, a separating equilibrium is a type of perfect Bayesian equilibrium where agents with different characteristics choose different actions.

== See also ==
- Signaling games
- Pooling equilibrium
- Cheap talk
