= Pooling equilibrium =

Equilibrium outcome of a signaling game

A pooling equilibrium in game theory is an equilibrium outcome of a signaling game.

In a signaling game, players send actions called "signals" to other players. These signals are based on privately held information, which is not known to others in the game. These actions do not reveal a player's "type" to other players, who then choose their strategies accordingly. In a pooling equilibrium, all types of a given sender send the same signal. Some senders represent their true type, while others correctly mimic the type of others, having no incentive to differentiate themselves. As a result, the receiver acts as if they have received no information, maximizing their utility according to their prior beliefs.

== See also ==
- Separating equilibrium
