= Sperm (disambiguation) =

Sperm is the male reproductive cell, or gamete, in anisogamous forms of sexual reproduction.

Sperm may also refer to:

== Reproduction ==
- Spermatozoon (zoosperm), a sperm cell propelled by a single flagellum, found in most animals
- Semen ("sperma"), the bodily fluid containing spermatozoa

== Related uses ==
- Sperm bank
- Sperm competition
- Sperm donation
- Sperm granuloma
- Sperm guidance
- Sperm heteromorphism
- Sperm motility
- Sperm precedence
- Sperm sorting
- Sperm theft
- Sperm washing

== Other uses ==
- Catch the Sperm, computer game
- The Sperm, a 2007 Thai film
- Sperm, a 1994 album by Oomph!
- Sperm Bluff, Victoria Land, Antarctica
- Sperm whale, a large toothed whale
- Sperm oil, substance obtained from sperm whales
- Sperm Wars, book by Robin Baker
- Spermine an Chemical
- "Sperm", a 1993 song by Baby Chaos

== See also ==
- Spèrme, a 2016 book by Michel Polnareff
