= Robin Baker (biologist) =

British novelist, scientist, author, lecturer and broadcaster

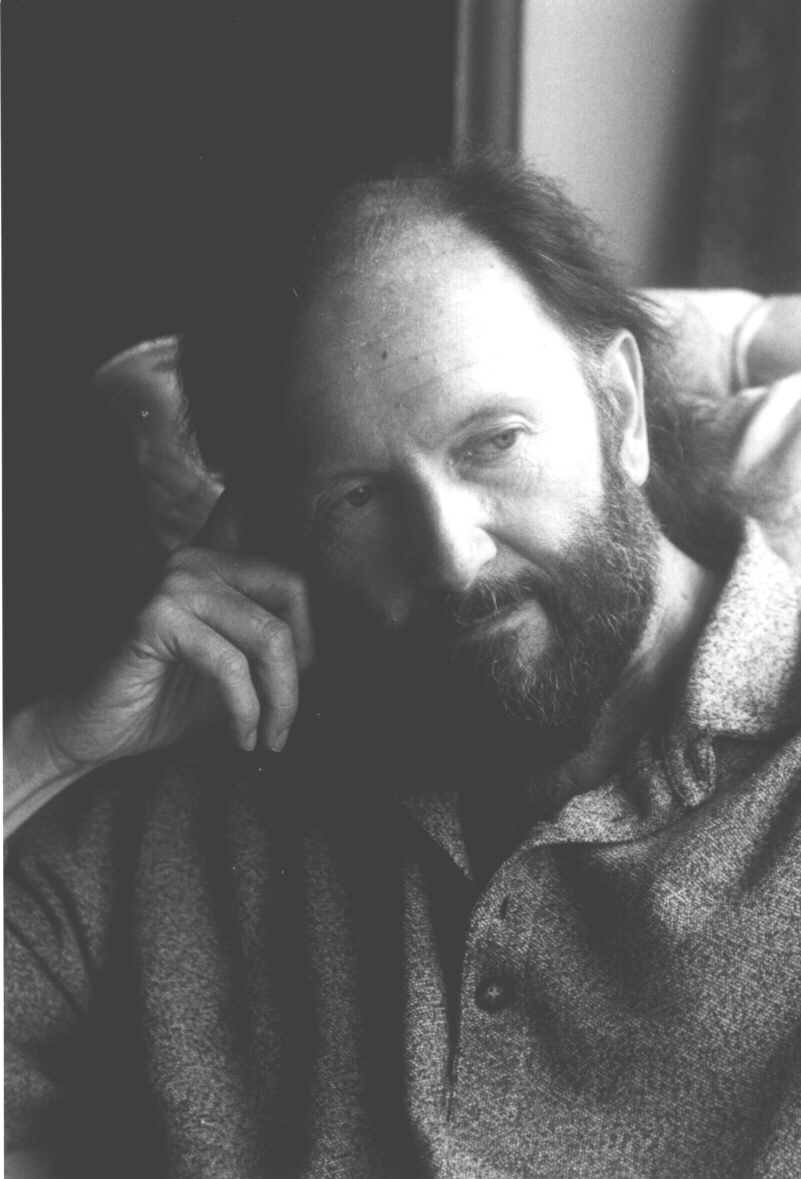
- Robin Baker pictured at his home in Didsbury, Manchester in 1998
- Born: Robin R. Baker; March 13, 1944
- Died: January 4, 2026 (aged 81)
- Education: Marlborough Royal Free Grammar School
- Alma mater: University of Bristol (BSc, PhD)
- Known for: Sperm Wars
- Scientific career
- Fields: Behavioural ecology Sperm competition Human sexuality
- Institutions: University of Manchester; University of Newcastle
- Doctoral advisor: Howard Hinton
- Website: www.robin-baker.com

Robin R. Baker (13 March 1944 - 4 January 2026) was a British novelist, scientist, popular science writer and broadcaster. A best-selling author in the field of sperm competition his books have been translated into 27 different languages. These include the international bestseller Sperm Wars which was based on his own lab's original research on human sexuality. His work and ideas on the evolution of human behaviour have been featured in many radio and television programmes.

== Education and early life ==
Born in Wiltshire, England in 1944, Robin Baker grew up in the small village of Manningford Bruce in the Vale of Pewsey. Educated at Marlborough Royal Free Grammar School, where thirty years earlier the author William Golding had also been educated, he gained his Bachelor of Science degree in Zoology from the University of Bristol in 1965, followed by a PhD in 1969 supervised by Howard Hinton. His thesis investigated the evolution of migration in butterflies and applied principles of behavioural ecology and evolutionary biology to the migration of insects. This work was subsequently published in the Philosophical Transactions of the Royal Society.

== Career and research ==
Baker moved to the University of Newcastle in 1970 and from there to the University of Manchester in 1974 where he was first a lecturer, and in 1981 a Reader in Zoology in the School of Biological Sciences. In 1996 he left academia to concentrate on his career in writing and broadcasting.

Although his early work was on evolutionary aspects of insect migration and territoriality, his interests broadened. With Geoff Parker and V.G.F. Smith in 1972, he proposed a theory for the evolution of anisogamy and two sexes and in 1979, with Geoff Parker he proposed the Unprofitable Prey Theory of the evolution of bird coloration. In 1978 in his book The Evolutionary Ecology of Animal Migration he wrote for the first time on the theme that permeated his work for the rest of his academic life: the application of the principles of evolutionary biology to the behaviour of humans. This led in the 1980s to controversial work on the role of magnetoreception in the navigation of humans, and in the 1990s (with Mark Bellis) to a study of sperm competition in humans and rats, including proposal of the kamikaze sperm hypothesis. Baker and Bellis' research into the evolutionary biology of infidelity, masturbation, sperm polymorphism, and sperm number in humans, as well as into the design and function of the human penis and cervix led to a number of scientific papers and an academic book: Human Sperm Competition: copulation, masturbation and infidelity.

Noticing that sperm in a mixed sample tends to clump together—making it less mobile—and to have a high mortality rate, reproductive biologist Robin Baker, formerly of the University of Manchester, proposed about a decade ago that some mammals, including humans, manufacture "killer" sperm whose only function is to attack foreign spermatozoa, destroying themselves in the process.

To test this idea, reproductive biologist Harry Moore and evolutionary ecologist Tim Birkhead of the University of Sheffield mixed sperm samples from 15 men in various combinations and checked for how the cells moved, clumped together, or developed abnormal shapes. "These are very simple experiments, but we tried to mimic what goes on in the reproductive tract," Moore says. The team found no excess casualties from any particular donor or other evidence of warring sperm, reported in the Proceedings of the Royal Society.

The kamikaze sperm hypothesis is probably not a mechanism in human sperm competition

— Tim Birkhead, No evidence for killer sperm or other selective interactions between human spermatozoa in ejaculates of different males in vitro

.

The findings were "the nail in the coffin for the kamikaze hypothesis," according to Michael Bedford, a reproductive biologist at Cornell University's Weill Medical Center in New York City. He said he had never given the idea much credence.

=== Publications ===
As well as being the author of around one hundred scientific papers and six academic books, Robin Baker is the author of four popular science books: Sperm Wars; Baby Wars; Sex in the Future; and Fragile Science. He has also written three novels: Primal; Caballito; and The Hitchhiker’s Child which under the guise of being sexual whodunits continue the theme of the evolution of human sexual behaviour. His first novel, Primal, was likened to both the TV series Lost and William Golding's Lord of the Flies. It describes a group of university students and staff stranded on a remote desert island occupied by feral chimpanzees. Bit by bit the people find themselves stripped of all the trappings of civilization until like the apes around them they have only their instincts to guide them.

In Sperm Wars, Baker asserted the human cuckolding rate to be at 10% and that women frequently cheat to secure better genes for their offspring. This figure was later debunked, because studies which rely on a data set consisting of men who have requested paternity tests are strongly sample biased toward those who have a reason to have suspicions. Men who have low paternity confidence and have chosen to challenge their paternity through laboratory testing are much less likely than men with high paternity confidence to be the fathers of their putative children. A survey of 67 studies reporting nonpaternity suggests that for men with high paternity confidence rates of nonpaternity are (excluding studies of unknown methodology) typically 1.9%, substantially less than the typical rates of 10% or higher cited by many researchers. "Media and popular scientific literature often claim that many alleged fathers are being cuckolded into raising children that biologically are not their own," said Maarten Larmuseau of KU Leuven in Belgium.

Surprisingly, the estimated rates within human populations are quite low--around 1 or 2 percent. But reliable data on contemporary populations that have become available over the last decade, mainly as supplementary results of medical studies, don't support the notion that one in 10 people don't know who their "real" fathers are. The findings suggest that any potential advantage of cheating in order to have children that are perhaps better endowed is offset for the majority of women by the potential costs, the researchers say. Those costs likely include spousal aggression, divorce, or reduced paternal investment by the social partner or his relatives. The observed low cuckoldry rates in contemporary and past human populations challenge clearly the well-known idea that women routinely 'shop around' for good genes by engaging in extra-pair copulations to obtain genetic benefits for their children

— Maarten Larmuseau, Cuckolded fathers rare in human populations

== Personal life ==
Baker died on 4 January 2026.
