= Geoff Parker =

Zoologist, evolutionary biologist

Geoff Parker FRS
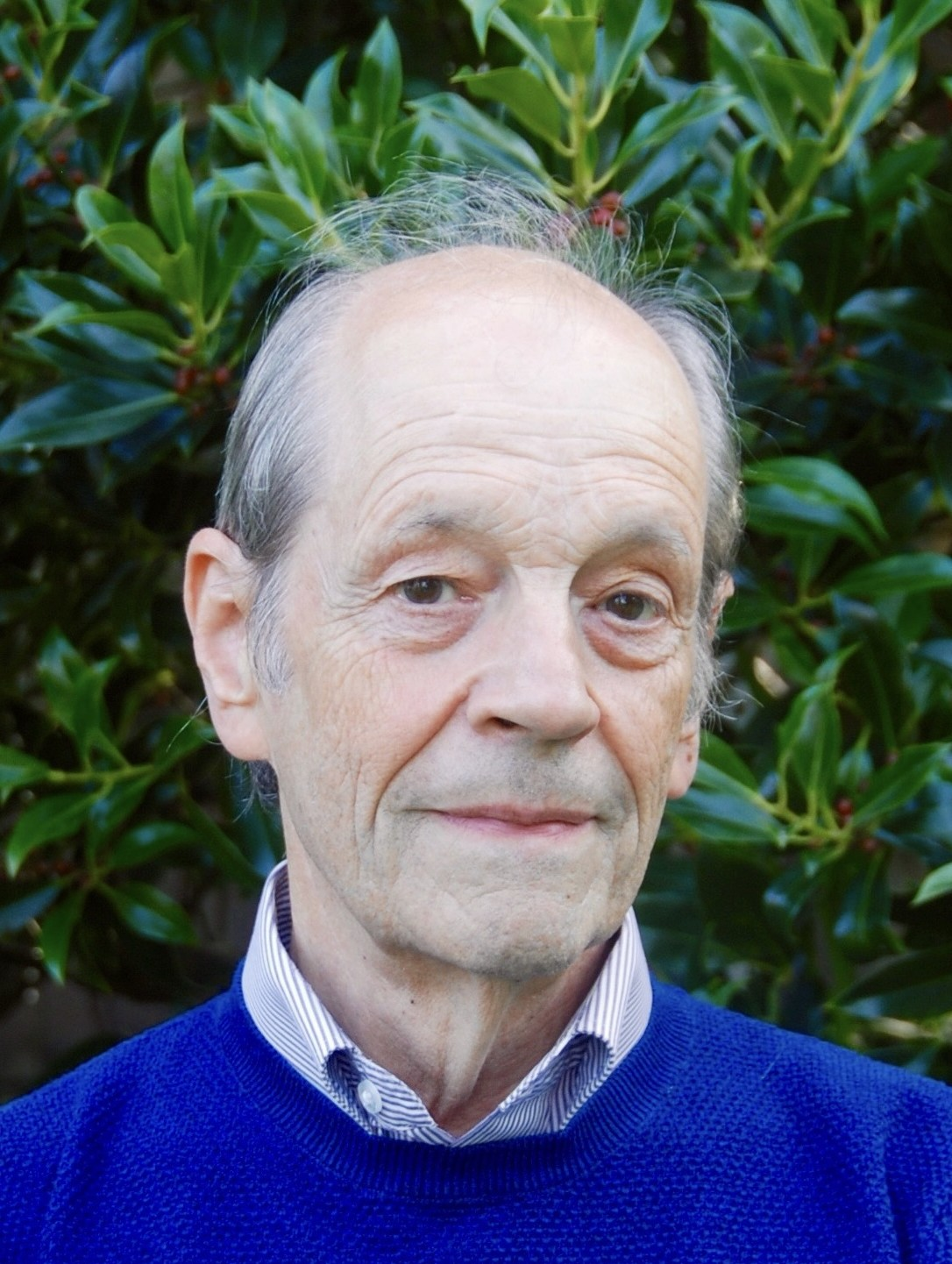
- Parker in 2018
- Born: Geoffrey Alan Parker; 24 May 1944 (age 82)
- Citizenship: British
- Education: Lymm High School
- Alma mater: University of Bristol (BSc, PhD)
- Known for: Sperm competition Evolutionary game theory
- Awards: ASAB Medal (2002); Frink Medal (2005); Darwin Medal (2008)
- Scientific career
- Fields: Behavioural ecology; Evolutionary biology
- Workplaces: University of Liverpool
- Thesis: The reproductive behaviour and the nature of sexual selection in Scathophaga stercoraria L. (the yellow dung fly) (1969)
- Doctoral advisor: Howard Hinton
- Website: www.liverpool.ac.uk/people/geoff-parker

Geoffrey Alan Parker FRS (born 24 May 1944) is an English evolutionary biologist, emeritus professor of biology at the University of Liverpool. Parker has been called "the professional's professional".

== Education ==
Parker attended Lymm Grammar School in Lymm, Cheshire, and gained his BSc from the University of Bristol in 1965, from where he also gained a doctorate in 1969 supervised by Howard Hinton on The reproductive behaviour and the nature of sexual selection in Scathophaga stercoraria L. (the yellow dung fly). His thesis provided a detailed quantitative test of Darwin's theory of sexual selection, and an early application of optimality theory in biology.

== Career and research ==
Parker moved to the University of Liverpool in 1968, where he became a lecturer in zoology. In 1978-79, he spent a year as a senior research fellow in the Research Centre at King's College, Cambridge. After returning to Liverpool he became a professor in 1989 following his election to the Royal Society. In 1996 he became the Derby Chair of Zoology at the University of Liverpool, retiring in 2009, but remaining as emeritus professor.

His main research interests have been in behavioural ecology and evolutionary biology. He is noted for introducing the concept of sperm competition and its evolutionary consequences in 1970 in a review on insect mating systems. This work pioneered the development of the field of postcopulatory sexual selection, the study of sexually selected adaptations arising from competition between the ejaculates of different mates.

Much of his work from the 1970s onwards has related to the application of game theory to various biological problems, using the evolutionarily stable strategy (ESS) approach pioneered by John Maynard Smith and George Price.

With R.R. Baker and V.G.F. Smith in 1972, he developed a theory for the evolution of anisogamy (the evolution of gametes of different sizes) and the two sexes, which is now widely accepted.

In 1974 he proposed that the outcome of animal fighting behaviour is determined by the relative values of the contested resource to each contestant and their assessments of relative resource holding potentials (related to relative fighting abilities). This led to the introduction of asymmetries between contestants in early evolutionary game theory. Parker also made the first theoretical analysis of sexual conflict in evolution in 1979.

Up to the early 1970s, most ethologists and ecologists had interpreted adaptations in terms of "survival value to the species" (group selection). However, the paradigm shift of the gene-centric view of evolution (popularised by Richard Dawkins in The Selfish Gene) shortly afterwards overturned this idea: mainstream views in behavioural ecology and sociobiology saw natural selection restored to Darwinian principles in terms of reproductive success of the individual (and its kin). Parker's work has played a part in this shift, especially in the development of behavioural ecology.

== Awards and distinctions ==
- Fellow of the Royal Society (1989).
- Niko Tinbergen Lecture (Annual Distinguished Lecture of the Association for the Study of Animal Behaviour) (1995).
- ASAB Medal (Association for the Study of Animal Behaviour Medal) (2002).
- Animal Behavior Society Distinguished Animal Behaviorist Award (2003).
- Frink Medal of the Zoological Society of London (2005).
- W. D. Hamilton Lecture (Biennial Distinguished Lecture of the International Society for Behavioral Ecology) (2006).
- Distinguished Zoologist Lecture, Benelux Congress of Zoology (2007).
- Spallazani Medal of the Conference on the Biology of Spermatozoa (2007).
- Darwin Medal of the Royal Society (2008).
- Honorary Doctor of Science, University of Bristol (2011).
- Honorary Fellow of the Royal Entomological Society (2012).
- Honorary Doctor of Science, Memorial University of Newfoundland (2018).
