= Marlborough Royal Free Grammar School =

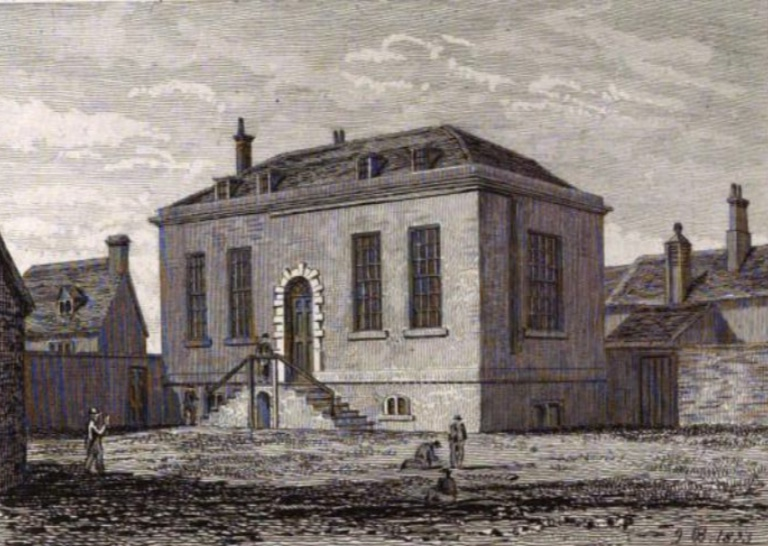
- The school in an engraving dated 1823

Location
- Marlborough, Wiltshire; England
- Coordinates: 51°25′N 1°43′W

Information
- Type: grammar school
- Motto: "Non nobis solum"
- Established: 1550; 476 years ago
- Closed: 1975
- Local authority: Wiltshire County Council
- Age: 11 to 18

Marlborough Royal Free Grammar School, previously known as Marlborough Grammar School and King Edward's School, Marlborough, was a grammar school in the town of Marlborough, in Wiltshire, England, founded in 1550.

Originally for boys only, the school became co-educational in 1906. Over a period of more than four hundred years, it had a number of homes around Marlborough. In 1975 it was closed, and its final buildings were re-used for the new St John's Marlborough comprehensive school.

== History ==
The Dissolution of Colleges Act 1547 closed all of the Kingdom of England's chantries, including the Hospital of St John, Marlborough. The town's burgesses then petitioned the Crown for the hospital to be converted into a "'Free-scole for the inducement of youth", and by letters patent dated 18 October 1550 a grammar school was established. The former hospital thus became the school's first home, but in 1578 it was demolished and a new building was erected which provided a schoolroom, a house for the schoolmaster, and dormitories. This survived until 1790.

The school was sometimes known as King Edward's School, Marlborough, in memory of King Edward VI, but in the course of the 18th century it began to be known as Marlborough Grammar School.

In 1834 a Charity Commissioners' report called the school the "Free Grammar School" and found that its original purpose was to teach Greek, Latin, and the church catechism, and that the governing body was the Corporation of Marlborough. Fourteen boys were then being taught the prescribed subjects without the payment of fees, but had to pay for other subjects. There were also twenty-six "pay-scholars", including some boarders.

In 1853 the school survived a proposal by Earl Bruce to amalgamate it with the new Marlborough College. During the nineteenth century it declined in numbers.

In 1872, the school had endowments worth £248 a year, and there were five schoolmasters teaching 85 boys. Some 37 of those were "sons of persons resident three years in town" and so were on the foundation, paying fees of six guineas a year, while the rest were boarders paying between 45 and 50 guineas. The school was entitled to Exhibitions at Brasenose College, Oxford, two worth £52 a year and four worth £36, and to a smaller number at St John's College, Cambridge.

In 1877, with the resignation of its long-serving Master Frederick Hookey Bond, the school was closed, awaiting the appointment of a new Master and a reorganisation. By 1880, it was again open, under a new scheme, and in December put on a prize-giving event. But by the 1890s, the school had dwindled to only six boys, taking intermittent lessons in a single room. In April 1899, the school was reported to be at a low ebb when its Master, the Rev. H. Tootell, accepted the benefice of Overton-cum-Fyfield and Alton Priors and resigned his post, with effect from the next term. This led to another closure, as in May it was agreed not to appoint a new Master until a new scheme had been agreed. However, reporting the school's demise in August, the Devizes and Wiltshire Gazette told its readers

"We have no doubt the old foundation, Marlborough Grammar School, with its 11 close scholarships at Oxford and Cambridge, will some day again occupy a leading position in the county."

After gaining grants from Wiltshire County Council and others, it was reported in January 1904 that the Governing Body of the school had accepted a tender from Downing and Rudman, of Chippenham, to pull down the old school and build a new one at a cost of £6,000 (equivalent to £816,555 in 2023).

In October 1905, the school reopened in new buildings on the same site, now formally known as Marlborough Grammar School and taking the form of a mixed school for eighty boys and girls, with a new headmaster, Sidney Pontefract. Most of the pupils were still boys, as the town's parents, particularly those of girls, were doubtful about co-education. Two classrooms were added in 1932, and by 1938 there were 300 pupils. A larger site to the south of the town was bought in 1936, but war and the subsequent restrictions prevented any building work there. In 1947 a boarding-house for both sexes was established at Wye House.

The school was eventually rehoused in 1962, in new buildings on the new site. In 1975, the school and the local secondary modern school, Marlborough Secondary Modern, were both closed, and a new comprehensive school, now called St John's Marlborough, was created and took over the buildings of both former schools. New school buildings were later built alongside those of the old grammar school, and the 1960s buildings were demolished in 2010.

== Masters ==
- John Hildrop, 1711
- William Stone, 1733–1750
- Thomas Neyler the Elder, 1750–1774
- Joseph Edwards, 1774–1808
- J. T. Lawes, 1809–1828
- T. Nayler, 1828
- Frederick Hookey Bond, 1853–1877
- H. Tootell, resigned 1899

== Headmasters ==
- Sidney Pontefract, 1905–1932
- Arthur Redvers Stedman, 1932–1962
- Michael Stevens, acting headmaster, 1963–1964
- William Roger Daffurn MA, 1964–1975

== Notable former pupils ==
See also Category:People educated at Marlborough Royal Free Grammar School

- Robin Baker, biologist and writer, author of Sperm Wars, attended 1955–1962
- Frederick Bligh Bond (1864–1945), architect
- General Sir Francis George Bond (1856–1930), British Army officer
- Alexander Meyrick Broadley (1847–1916), lawyer and author
- Edward Caswall (1814–1878), clergyman, poet, and hymn writer
- Charles Chenery (1850–1928), international footballer
- Michael Dodson (1732–1799), lawyer and writer on religious subjects
- Sir William Golding novelist, Nobel Laureate in Literature
- Phil Hammond (born 1962), comedian
- Phil Harding (born 1950), archaeologist, known for Channel 4's Time Team
- Walter Harte (1709–1774), poet and historian
- Frederick Maddison (1849–1907), previously known as Frederick Patey Chappell, footballer who played for England in the first international football match
- Henry Moule (1801–1880), clergyman and inventor of the dry earth closet
- Henry Sacheverell (1674–1724), high church clergyman
- John Whitelocke (1757–1833), British Army general

== See also ==
- List of English and Welsh endowed schools (19th century)
