= Caballito (disambiguation) =

Caballito means "little horse" in Spanish. It may refer to:

- Caballito, Buenos Aires
- Caballito, a 1910 Mexican peso coin
- Caballito, a rhythm found in merengue music
- Caballito, a Panamanian gin
- Caballito, a Mexican type of narrow shot glass
- Caballito de Tolsá, an equestrian statue of Charles IV
- Caballito Island in the Kindred comic book
- Caballito, 2012 novel by Dr Robin Baker
