= Austrolimnius nomia =

Scientific classification
- Kingdom: Animalia
- Phylum: Arthropoda
- Class: Insecta
- Order: Coleoptera
- Suborder: Polyphaga
- Infraorder: Elateriformia
- Family: Elmidae
- Genus: Austrolimnius
- Species: A. nomia

Binomial name
- Austrolimnius nomia (Hinton, 1965)

Species of beetle

Austrolimnius nomia is a beetle in the Elmidae family. The scientific name of this species was first published in 1965 by Hinton.
