= Anisogamy =

Sexual reproduction involving a large, female gamete and a small, male gamete

Different forms of anisogamy: A) anisogamy of motile cells, B) oogamy (egg cell and sperm cell), C) anisogamy of non-motile cells (egg cell and spermatia).

Anisogamy is a form of sexual reproduction that involves the union or fusion of two gametes that differ in size and/or form. The smaller gamete is male, a microgamete or sperm cell, whereas the larger gamete is female, a larger macrogamete or typically an egg cell. Anisogamy is predominant among multicellular organisms. In both plants and animals, gamete size difference is the fundamental difference between females and males.

Anisogamy most likely evolved from isogamy. Since the biological definition of male and female is based on gamete size, the evolution of anisogamy is viewed as the evolutionary origin of male and female sexes. Anisogamy is an outcome of both natural selection and sexual selection, and led the sexes to evolve different primary and secondary sex characteristics including sex differences in behavior.

Geoff Parker, Robin Baker, and Vic Smith were the first to provide a mathematical model for the evolution of anisogamy that was consistent with modern evolutionary theory. Their theory was widely accepted but there are alternative hypotheses about the evolution of anisogamy.

== Etymology ==
Anisogamy (the opposite of isogamy) comes from the ancient Greek negative prefix a(n)- (alpha privative), the Greek adjective isos (meaning equal) and the Greek verb gameo (meaning to have sex/to reproduce), eventually meaning "non-equal reproduction" obviously referring to the enormous differences between male and female gametes in size and abilities. The first known use of the term "anisogamous" was in the year 1891.

== Definition ==
Anisogamy is the form of sexual reproduction that involves the union or fusion of two gametes which differ in size and/or form. The smaller gamete is considered to be male (a sperm cell), whereas the larger gamete is regarded as female (typically an egg cell, if non-motile).

There are several types of anisogamy. Both gametes may be flagellated and therefore motile. Alternatively, as in flowering plants, conifers and gnetophytes, neither of the gametes are flagellated. In these groups, the male gametes are non-motile cells within pollen grains, and are delivered to the egg cells by means of pollen tubes. In the red alga Polysiphonia, non-motile eggs are fertilized by non-motile sperm.

The form of anisogamy that occurs in animals, including humans, is oogamy, where a large, non-motile egg (ovum) is fertilized by a small, motile sperm (spermatozoon). The egg is optimized for longevity, whereas the small sperm is optimized for motility and speed. The size and resources of the egg cell allow for the production of pheromones, which attract the swimming sperm cells.

== Sexual dimorphism ==
Anisogamy is a core element of sexual dimorphism that helps to explain phenotypic differences between sexes. Researchers estimate that over 99.99% of eukaryotes reproduce sexually. Most do so by way of male and female sexes, both of which are optimized for reproductive potential. Due to their differently sized and shaped gametes, both males and females have developed physiological and behavioral differences that optimize the individual's fecundity. Since most egg laying females typically must bear the offspring and have a more limited reproductive cycle, this typically makes females a limiting factor in the reproductive success rate of males in a species. This process is also true for females selecting males, and assuming that males and females are selecting for different traits in partners, would result in phenotypic differences between the sexes over many generations. This hypothesis, known as the Bateman's Principle, is used to understand the evolutionary pressures put on males and females due to anisogamy. Although this assumption has criticism, it is a generally accepted model for sexual selection within anisogamous species. The selection for different traits depending on sex within the same species is known as sex-specific selection, and accounts for the differing phenotypes found between the sexes of the same species. This sex-specific selection between sexes over time also leads to the development of secondary sex characteristics, which assist males and females in reproductive success.

In most species, both sexes choose mates based on the available phenotypes of potential mates. These phenotypes are species-specific, resulting in varying strategies for successful sexual reproduction. For example, large males are sexually selected for in elephant seals because their large size helps the male fight off other males, but small males are sexually selected for in spiders for they can mate with the female more quickly while avoiding sexual cannibalism. However, despite the large range of sexually selected phenotypes, most anisogamous species follow a set of predictable desirable traits and selective behaviors based on general reproductive success models.

=== Female phenotypes ===
For internal fertilizers, female investment is high in reproduction since they typically expend more energy throughout a single reproductive event. This can be seen as early as oogenesis, for the female sacrifices gamete number for gamete size to better increase the survival chances of the potential zygote; a process more energetically demanding than spermatogenesis in males. Oogenesis occurs in the ovary, a female-specific organ that also produces hormones to prepare other female-specific organs for the changes necessary in the reproductive organs to facilitate egg delivery in external fertilizers, and zygote development in internal fertilizers. The egg cell produced is not only large, but sometimes even immobile, requiring contact with the more mobile sperm to instigate fertilization.

Since this process is very energy-demanding and time-consuming for the female, mate choice is often integrated into the female's behavior. Females will often be very selective of the males they choose to reproduce with, for the phenotype of the male can be indicative of the male's physical health and heritable traits. This encourages males and females of specific species to invest in courtship behaviors as well as traits that can display physical health to a potential mate. This process, known as sexual selection, results in the development of traits to ease reproductive success rather than individual survival, such as the inflated size of a termite queen. It is also important for females to select against potential mates that may have a sexually transmitted infection, for the disease could not only hurt the female's reproductive ability, but also damage the resulting offspring.

Although not uncommon in males, females are more associated with parental care. Since females are on a more limited reproductive schedule than males, a female often invests more in protecting the offspring to sexual maturity than the male. Like mate choice, the level of parental care varies greatly between species, and is often dependent on the number of offspring produced per sexual encounter.

In many species, including ones from all major vertebrate groups females can utilize sperm storage, a process by which the female can store excess sperm from a mate, and fertilize her eggs long after the reproductive event if mating opportunities drop or quality of mates decreases. By being able to save sperm from more desirable mates, the female gains more control over its own reproductive success, thus allowing for the female to be more selective of males as well as making the timing of fertilization potentially more frequent if males are scarce.

=== Male phenotypes ===
For males of all species, the sperm cells they produce are optimized for ensuring fertilization of the female egg. These sperm cells are created through spermatogenesis, a form of gametogenesis that focuses on developing the most possible gametes per sexual encounter. Spermatogenesis occurs in the testis, a male specific organ that also produces hormones that trigger the development of secondary sex characteristics. Since the male's gametes are energetically cheap and abundant in every ejaculation, a male can greatly increase his sexual success by mating far more frequently than the female. Sperm, unlike egg cells, are also mobile, allowing for the sperm to swim towards the egg through the female's sexual organs. Sperm competition is also a major factor in the development of sperm cells. Only one sperm can fertilize an egg, and since females can potentially mate with more than one male before fertilization occurs, producing sperm cells that are faster, more abundant, and more viable than that produced by other males can give a male reproductive advantage.

Since females are often the limiting factor in a species reproductive success, males are often expected by the females to search and compete for the female, known as intraspecific competition. This can be seen in organisms such as bean beetles, as the male that searches for females more frequently is often more successful at finding mates and reproducing. In species undergoing this form of selection, a fit male would be one that is fast, has more refined sensory organs, and spatial awareness.

Some secondary sex characteristics are not only meant for attracting mates, but also for competing with other males for copulation opportunities. Some structures, such as antlers in deer, can provide benefits to the male's reproductive success by providing a weapon to prevent rival males from achieving reproductive success. However, other structures such as the large colorful tail feathers found in male peacocks, are a result of Fisherian runaway as well as several more species specific factors. Due to females selecting for specific traits in males, over time, these traits are exaggerated to the point where they could hinder the male's survivability. However, since these traits greatly benefit sexual selection, their usefulness in providing more mating opportunities overrides the possibility that the trait could lead to a shortening of its lifespan through predation or starvation. These desirable traits extend beyond physical body parts, and often extend into courtship behavior and nuptial gifts as well.

Although some behaviors in males are meant to work within the parameters of female choice, some male traits work against it. Strong enough males, in some cases, can force themselves upon a female, forcing fertilization and overriding female choice. Since this can often be dangerous for the female, an evolutionary arms race between the sexes is often an outcome.

== History ==
Charles Darwin wrote that anisogamy had an impact on the evolution of sexual dimorphism. He also argued that anisogamy had an impact on sexual behavior. Anisogamy first became a major topic in the biological sciences when Charles Darwin wrote about sexual selection.

Mathematical models seeking to account for the evolution of anisogamy were published as early as 1932, but the first model consistent with evolutionary theory was that published by Geoff Parker, Robin Baker and Vic Smith in 1972.

== Evolution ==
Although its evolution has left no fossil records, it is generally accepted that anisogamy evolved from isogamy and that it has evolved independently in several groups of eukaryotes including protists, algae, plants and animals. According to John Avise anisogamy probably originated around the same time sexual reproduction and multicellularity occurred. It occurred 1 billion years ago. Anisogamy first evolved in multicellular haploid species after different mating types had become established.

The three main theories for the evolution of anisogamy are gamete competition, gamete limitation, and intracellular conflicts, but the last of these three is not well supported by current evidence. Both gamete competition and gamete limitation assume that anisogamy originated through disruptive selection acting on an ancestral isogamous population with external fertilization, due to a trade-off between larger gamete number and gamete size (which in turn affects zygote survival), because the total resource one individual can invest in reproduction is assumed to be fixed.

The first formal, mathematical theory proposed to explain the evolution of anisogamy was based on gamete limitation: this model assumed that natural selection would lead to gamete sizes that result in the largest population-wide number of successful fertilizations. If it is assumed that a certain amount of resources provided by the gametes are needed for the survival of the resulting zygote, and that there is a trade-off between the size and number of gametes, then this optimum was shown to be one where both small (male) and large (female) gametes are produced. However, these early models assume that natural selection acts mainly at the population level, something that is today known to be a very problematic assumption.

The first mathematical model to explain the evolution of anisogamy via individual level selection, and one that became widely accepted was the theory of gamete or sperm competition. Here, selection happens at the individual level: those individuals that produce more (but smaller) gametes also gain a larger proportion of fertilizations simply because they produce a larger number of gametes that 'seek out' those of the larger type. However, because zygotes formed from larger gametes have better survival prospects, this process can again lead to the divergence of gametes sizes into large and small (female and male) gametes. The end result is one where it seems that the numerous, small gametes compete for the large gametes that are tasked with providing maximal resources for the offspring.

Some recent theoretical work has challenged the gamete competition theory, by showing that gamete limitation by itself can lead to the divergence of gamete sizes even under selection at the individual level. While this is possible, it has also been shown that gamete competition and gamete limitation are the ends of a continuum of selective pressures, and they can act separately or together depending on the conditions. These selection pressures also act in the same direction (to increase gamete numbers at the expense of size) and at the same level (individual selection). Theory also suggests that gamete limitation could only have been the dominant force of selection for the evolutionary origin of the sexes under quite limited circumstances, and the presence on average of just one competitor can makes the 'selfish' evolutionary force of gamete competition stronger than the 'cooperative' force of gamete limitation even if gamete limitation is very acute (approaching 100% of eggs remaining unfertilized).

There is then a relatively sound theory base for understanding this fundamental transition from isogamy to anisogamy in the evolution of reproduction, which is predicted to be associated with the transition to multicellularity. In fact, Hanschen et al. (2018) demonstrate that anisogamy evolved from isogamous multicellular ancestors and that anisogamy would subsequently drive secondary sexual dimorphism. Some comparative empirical evidence for the gamete competition theories exists, although it is difficult to use this evidence to fully tease apart the competition and limitation theories because their testable predictions are similar. It has also been claimed that some of the organisms used in such comparative studies do not fit the theoretical assumptions well.

"Inflated isogamy" hypothesis

In 2022, Yasui proposed the "inflated isogamy" hypothesis, offering a new perspective on the evolution of anisogamy beyond the size-disruptive selection assumed in the Parker–Baker–Smith (PBS) model. In unicellular organisms, the basic state of 'smart isogamy' is observed. In this state, each parent (size 2R) splits the minimum amount of resources required for survival (R) by producing four isogametes, each of size 0.5R, through meiosis. One of these isogametes then fuses with another (0.5R + 0.5R = R). If one parent reduces its gamete size (i.e., attempts to become male), the resulting zygote fails to reach the required size R and dies. Moreover, unicellular organisms can produce only up to four gametes. However, with the evolution of multicellularity, resource production capacity increased, allowing gamete size in both sexes to "inflate" to 1R, forming zygotes of 2R. This created a temporary state in which the zygote received more resources than strictly necessary for survival. At this point, one sex adopted a "cheating" strategy by reducing its gamete size to 0.5R and thereby lowering its own investment, gaining an advantage by producing many small gametes (i.e., sperm) and fertilizing multiple partners—note that multicellularity enabled the production of more than four, even five or more, gametes. This marked the origin of males. Initially, the opposite sex (which became female) did not change its investment from the inflated isogamy state and accepted this "cheating" without gaining or losing from it, resulting in a state of commensalism in which only males benefitted. However, as males began to supply numerous small gametes, the fertilization rate increased, and females also gained an advantage by reducing the risk of unfertilized eggs. Thus, the relationship between males and females evolved into mutualism, where each compensated for the other's weaknesses—females providing nutrition but lacking mobility, and males offering mobility but lacking nutritional contribution. Eventually, this mutualistic relationship stabilized into a distinct dimorphism: large, immobile eggs and tiny, motile sperm—a stable form of anisogamy with two separate sexes.

A valuable model system to the study of the evolution of anisogamy is the volvocine algae, which group of chlorophytes is quite unique for its extant species exhibit a diversity of mating systems (isogamy and anisogamy) in addition to its extremes in both unicellularity and multicellularity with a diversity of forms in species of intermediate ranges of sizes. Marine algae have been closely studied to understand the trajectories of such diversified reproductive systems, evolution of sex and mating types, as well as the adaptiveness and stability of anisogamy.

== See also ==
- Bateman's principle
- Evolution of sex
- Meiosis
- Biological sex
