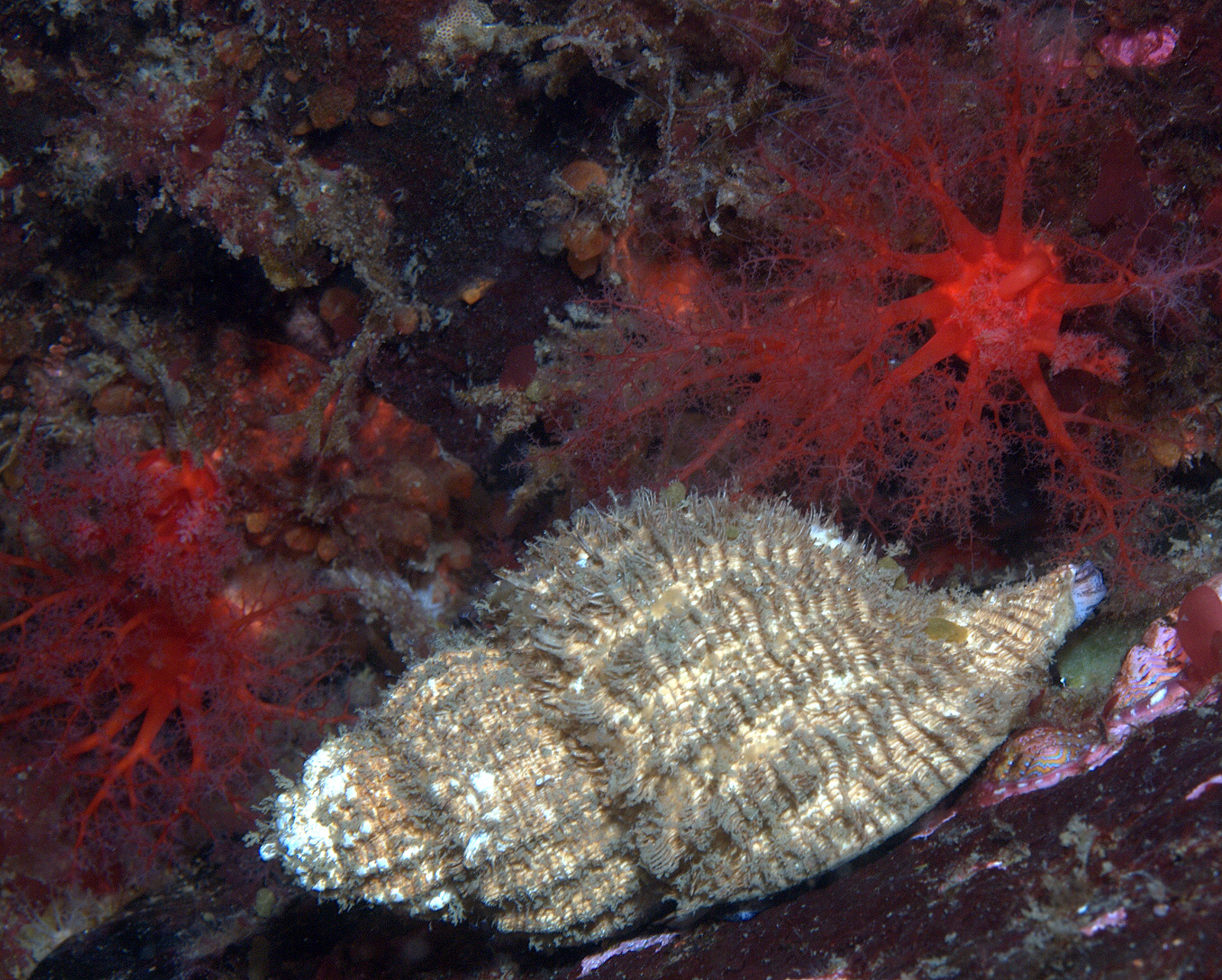

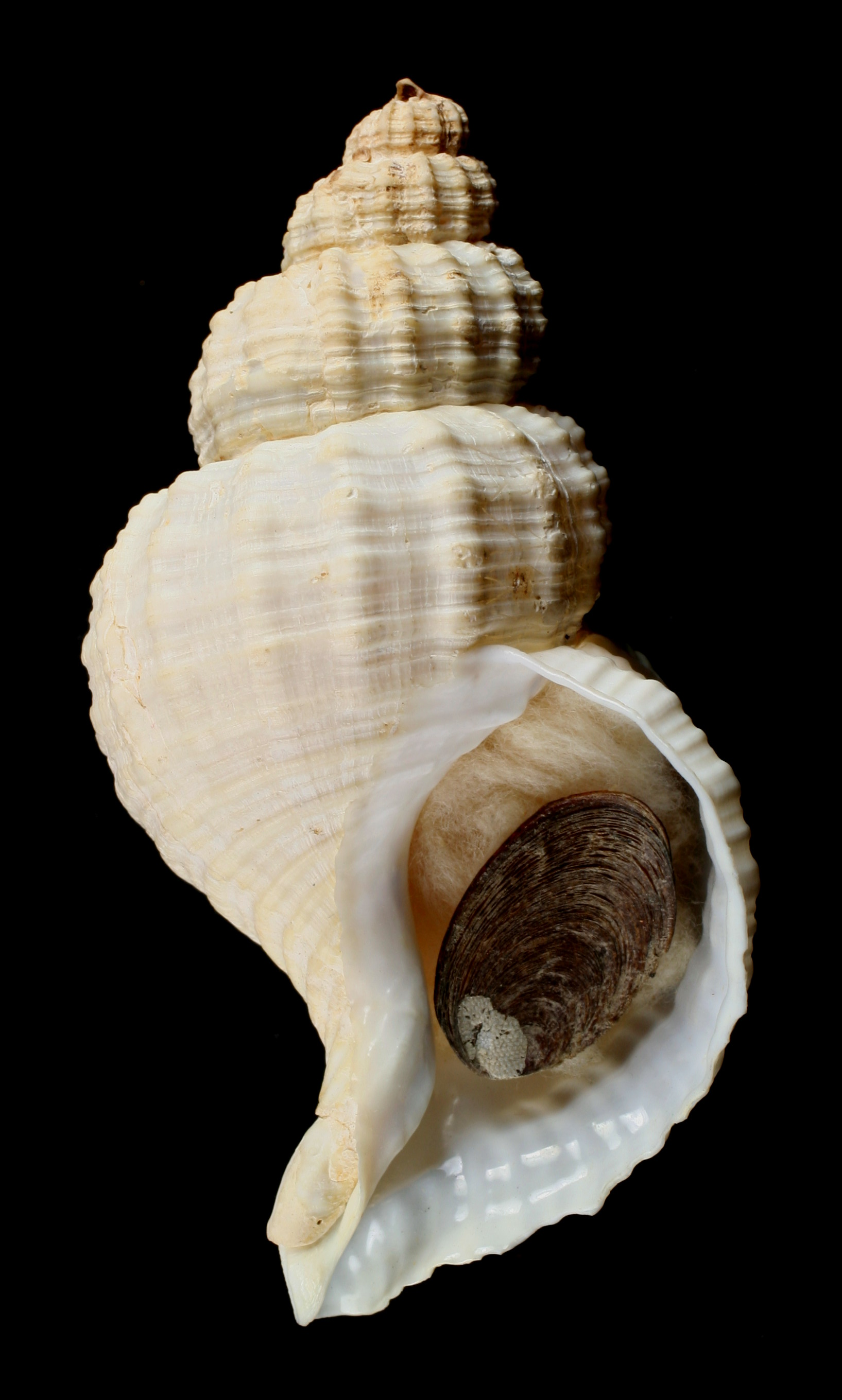
- Apertural view of Fusitriton oregonensis (Redfield, 1846) with operculum

Scientific classification
- Kingdom: Animalia
- Phylum: Mollusca
- Class: Gastropoda
- Subclass: Caenogastropoda
- Order: Littorinimorpha
- Family: Cymatiidae
- Genus: Fusitriton
- Species: F. oregonensis

Binomial name
- Fusitriton oregonensis Redfield, 1846

= Fusitriton oregonensis =

Oregon hairy triton

Species of gastropod

Fusitriton oregonensis (Oregon hairy triton) is a species of large predatory sea snail, a marine gastropod mollusk in the family Cymatiidae.

The snail was given its specific name oregonensis (meaning "of Oregon") to honor the Oregon Territory by conchologist John Howard Redfield in 1846.

It was declared the state seashell of Oregon in 1989 by the 65th Legislative Assembly.

== Distribution ==
The Oregon hairy triton is native to the northwestern coast of North America. The shells are found from Alaska to California, as well as in northern Japan. The shells often wash up on the coast during high tides.

== Shell description ==
The shells grow from 8 to 13 centimetres (3 to 5 in) long. The shell is light brown in color and is covered with gray-brown bristly periostracum, hence the name "hairy." The shell is an elongate cone with six whorls (or turns) around a central axis.

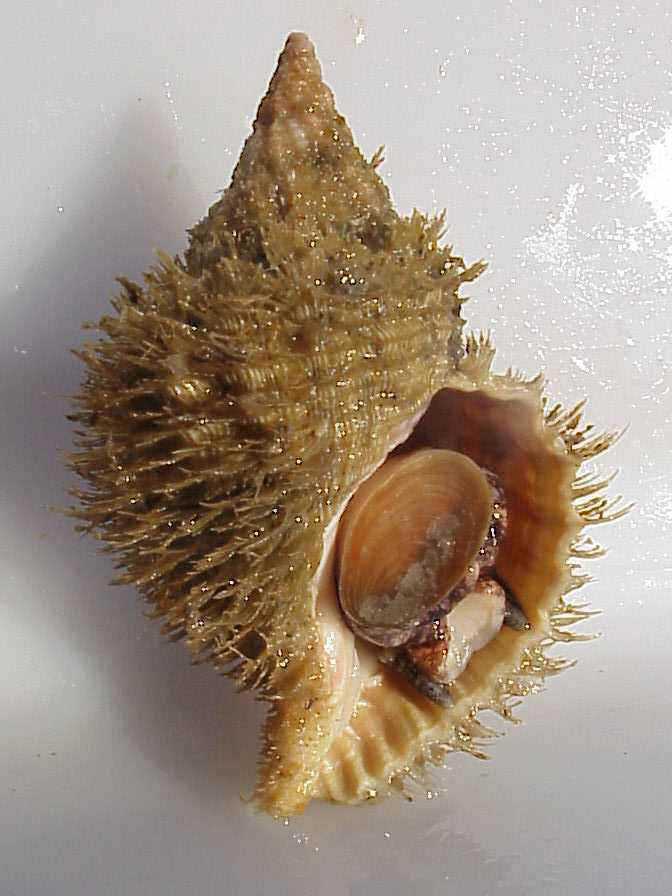
Apertural view of a juvenile with operculum and contracted soft parts visible

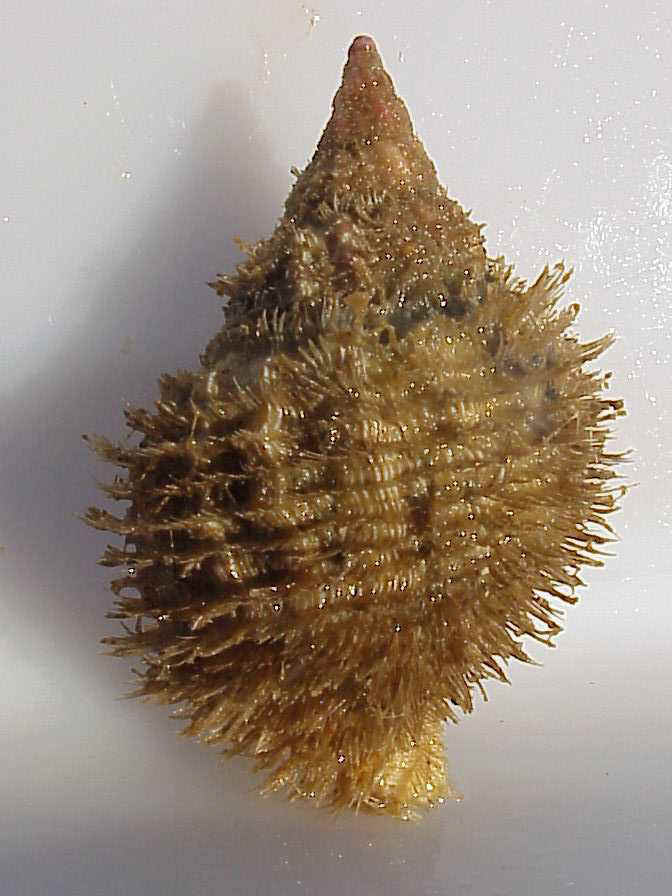
Abapertural view of the shell.

== Habitat ==
This species is common subtidally.

== Life habits ==
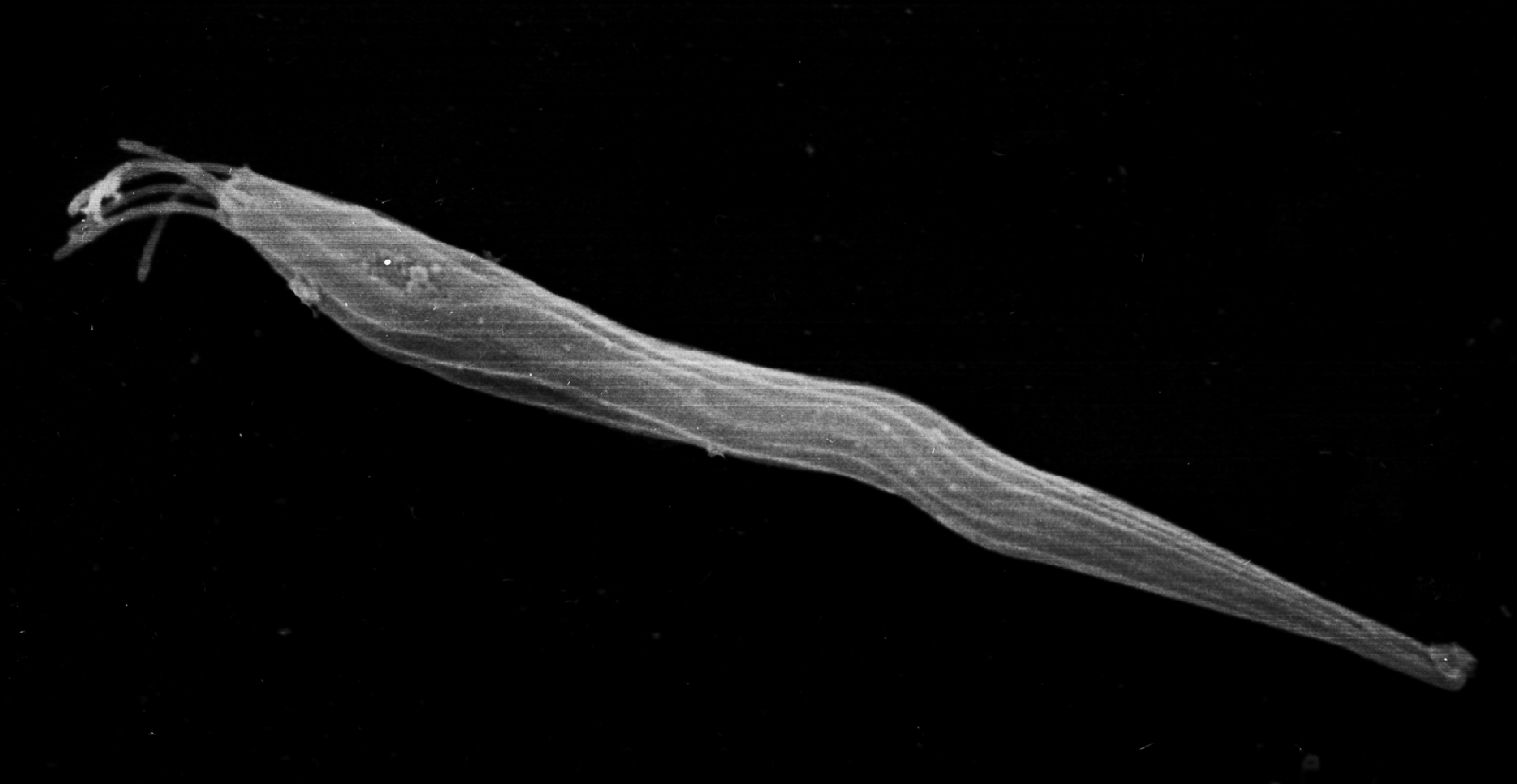
Scanning electron microscopic image of immature parasperm lancet (infertile sperm morph) of Fusitriton oregonensis showing the tail brush still present, which later develops into part of the body of the parasperm. It is producing when sperm competition occurs.

Little is known of the snail's feeding habits, but they are believed to feed on other mollusks, ascidians ("sea squirts"), and more rarely, sea urchins. The species also holds the record for longest larval development period of any marine invertebrate, able to delay metamorphosis for over 4 years until presented with appropriate habitat. Under laboratory conditions, the larvae showed no signs of senescence at that point. According to some authorities, four years is long enough to drift completely across the Pacific Ocean.
