= Oogamy =

Form of sexual reproduction

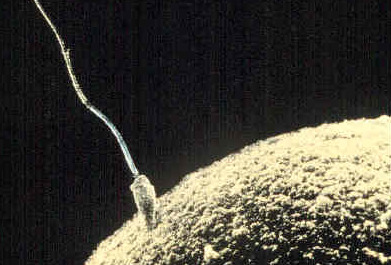
Oogamy in animals: small, motile sperm on the surface of an ovum

Oogamy is a type of sexual reproduction where the gametes differ greatly in both size and form. In oogamy in animals the large female gamete (also known as the ovum) is immobile, while the small male gamete (also known as a sperm) is mobile. Most sexually reproducing species – animals, land plants and some algae, are oogamous. It is generally accepted that isogamy is the ancestral state, from which oogamy evolved at least twenty times via anisogamy. Once oogamy evolves, males and females typically differ in various aspects. Internal fertilization may have originated from oogamy, although some studies suggest certain species may have evolved before the transition from external to internal fertilization. In streptophytes, oogamy occurred before the split from green algae.

== Occurrence ==
Oogamy is found in almost all animal species that reproduce sexually. There are exceptions, such as the opiliones that have immobile sperm.

Oogamy is found in all land plants, and in some red algae, brown algae and green algae. Oogamy is favored in land plants because only one gamete has to travel through harsh environments outside the plant. Oogamy is also present in oomycetes.

== Etymology ==
The term oogamy was first used in the year 1888. It derives from the Greek noun "oon" (ΩΟΝ = egg) and the Greek verb "gameo" (ΓΑΜΕΩ → ΓΑΜΩ = to have sex/to reproduce) and eventually means "reproduction through eggs".

== Evolution ==
The ancestral state of sexual reproduction is probably isogamy, in which both gametes are identical, from which oogamy is thought to have evolved multiple times through anisogamy. When oogamy has evolved, males and females typically differ in many aspects. Oogamy evolved before the transition from external to internal fertilization.

In streptophytes, oogamy occurred before the split from green algae.
