= Resource holding potential =

Biological concept

In biology, resource holding potential (RHP) is the ability of an animal to win an all-out fight if one were to take place. The term was coined by Geoff Parker to disambiguate physical fighting ability from the motivation to persevere in a fight (Parker, 1974). Originally the term used was 'resource holding power', but 'resource holding potential' has come to be preferred. The latter emphasis on 'potential' serves as a reminder that the individual with greater RHP does not always prevail.

An individual with more RHP may lose a fight if, for example, it is less motivated (has less to gain by winning) than its opponent. Mathematical models of RHP and motivation (a.k.a. resource value or V) have traditionally been based on the hawk-dove game (e.g. Hammerstein, 1981) in which subjective resource value is represented by the variable 'V'. In addition to RHP and V, George Barlow (Barlow et al., 1986) proposed that a third variable, which he termed 'daring', played a role in determining fight outcome. Daring (a.k.a. aggressiveness) represents an individual's tendency to initiate or escalate a contest independent of the effects of RHP and V.

It is instinctive for all animals to live a life according to fitness (Parker 1974). Animals will do what they can to improve their fitness and therefore survive long enough to produce offspring. However, when resources are not in abundance, this can be challenging; eventually, animals will begin to compete for resources. The competition for resources can be dangerous and for some animals, deadly. Some animals have developed adaptive traits that increase their chances of survival when competing for resources. This trait is Resource Holding Potential (RHP) (Parker 1974). Resource Holding Potential, or Resource Holding Power, is the term defining the motivation an individual has to continue to fight, work, or endure through situations that others may give up during. Animals that use RHP often evaluate the conditions of the danger they face. These animals have the ability to assess the RHP of their opponent in relation to their own (Francesca Gherardi 2006). Generally, the animal with the higher RHP survives and wins the disputes they encounter (Lindström and Pampoulie 2005). The determinations of who has the higher RHP can vary. In some cases, the robust size of the animal will establish one’s dominance. However, RHP can also be measured by prior residency and knowledge of resource quality (Lindström and Pampoulie 2005). In this case, RHP is not about the direct dangers that come with standing one’s ground; sometimes, an animal will use RHP to determine if their current living status is worth protecting. With that being said, RHP does not take does not so much focus on the physical ability of the individual to fight, but instead focuses on the motivation of the individual. RHP does not always determine if the individual will prevail (Hurd 2006). RHP along with other variables including the value of the resource and the aggressiveness (or daring) of the individual all help to determine how likely it is that an individual will initiate and prevail in a fight.

== Recent studies ==
Male sand gobies (a ray-finned fish) must build large nests in order to attract a mate, and to be able to house numerous eggs. If the male is small and not very attractive but has a large nest, he is at risk of a larger more attractive male coming by and attempting to “steal” the nest. On the other hand, if the male is larger in size but lives in a smaller nest, he has a lesser chance of finding a mate and less space to house his offspring. In either case, the male sand goby must use RHP to determine whether it is more fit for him to stay or move on (Lindström and Pampoulie 2005).

In Aegus chelifer chelifer, a small tropical beetle species, head width is considered a resource holding potential. Researchers discovered that body size, rather than mandible size, had a bigger effect on the outcome of fights between the beetles, making it their resource holding potential (Songvorawit et al. 2018). In the sea anemone, Actinia equina, morphological traits appear to determine their resource holding potential. A. equina does a “self-assessment” of their RHP when fighting nearby anemones. Body size appears to be the main RHP unless a peel occurs due to contact with another anemone where toxin is released. If a peel occurs then nematocyst length is the main factor to their RHP (Rudin and Briffa 2012).

The topic of resource holding power has some similar characteristics to the behavior of conditional migration. The thought process of “What benefit do I receive from this action,” is a similarity between the two. If an all out fight only has two outcomes, death, or winning the competition for resources, than the individuals will be less likely to interact with one another and instigate a fight because the outcomes would be so severe. Similar concepts can be applied to the conditional migration behavior. Subordinate males will be less likely to migrate because of the severe outcomes that come from the migration. If subordinates migrate with dominant males to a place where resources will be limited their likelihood of surviving is greatly reduced. What benefit could they receive knowing that most likely they are going to lose resources.

Conditional strategy - socially dominant individuals will be in a position to select the best option relative to their fitness.

== Examples of the term in use ==
- "... RHP is a measure of the absolute fighting ability of the individual" (Parker, 1974).
- "Assuming the RHP of the combatants to be equal, there are many instances of fitness pay-off imbalances between holder and attacker which should weight the dispute outcome in favour of one or other opponent by allowing it a greater expendable fitness budget. Usually the weighting favours the holder; the attacker therefore needs a correspondingly higher RHP before it may be expected to win." (Parker, 1974).
- "Each combatant assesses relative RHP; this correlates with an absolute probability of winning the next bout ($C_{abs}$)." (Parker, 1974).
- "The essential point is to distinguish two cases (i) information about 'motivation' or 'intentions' [...] (ii) information about 'Resource Holding Power', or RHP (Parker, 1974b); RHP is a measure of the size, strength, weapons, etc. which would enable an animal to win an escalated contest" (Maynard Smith 1982).
- "In practice, however, the two opponents are rarely equal in fighting ability, or resource holding potential" (Bradbury & Vehrencamp, 1998).
- "Motivational and physical components are assumed to be separable. ... The motivation depends upon V, the value of the resource, and the perceived prowess and motivation of the opponent. ... but there is an additional component. It is the readiness of the individual to risk an encounter, to dare to escalate, measured when the contest is otherwise symmetrical. It differs from V in that daring appears to be an inherent property of the individual rather than a variable motivational state that is tuned to the value of the resource" (Barlow et al. 1986).

== See also ==
- Aggression
- Game theory
- Social defeat
