= Female =

Sex of an organism that produces ovums

The symbol of the Roman goddess Venus is used to represent the female sex in biology.

An organism's sex is female (symbol: ♀) if it produces the ovum (egg cell), the type of gamete (sex cell) that fuses with the male gamete (sperm cell) during sexual reproduction.

A female has larger gametes than a male. Females and males are results of the anisogamous reproduction system, wherein gametes are of different sizes (unlike isogamy where they are the same size).

In species that have males and females, sex-determination may be based on either sex chromosomes, or environmental conditions. Most female mammals, including female humans, have two X chromosomes. Characteristics of organisms with a female sex vary between different species, having different female reproductive systems, with some species showing characteristics secondary to the reproductive system, as with mammary glands in mammals.

In humans, the word female can also be used to refer to gender in the social sense of gender role or gender identity.

== Etymology and usage ==
"fæmnan", an Old English word for 'female'

The word female comes from the Latin femella, the diminutive form of femina, meaning "woman", by way of the Old French femelle. It is not etymologically related to the word male, but in the late 14th century the English spelling was altered to parallel that of male. It has been used as both noun and adjective since the 14th century. Originally, from its first appearance in the 1300s, female exclusively referred to humans and always indicated that the speaker spoke of a woman or a girl. A century later, the meaning was expanded to include non-human female organisms.

For several centuries, using the word female as a noun was considered more respectful than calling her a woman or a lady and was preferred for that reason; however, by 1895, the linguistic fashion had changed, and female was often considered disparaging, usually on the grounds that it grouped humans with other animals. In the 21st century, the noun female is primarily used to describe non-human animals, to refer to biologically female humans in an impersonal technical context (e.g., "Females were more likely than males to develop an autoimmune disease"), or to impartially include a range of people without reference to age (e.g., girls) or social status (e.g., lady). As an adjective, female is still used in some contexts, particularly when the sex of the person is relevant, such as female athletes or to distinguish a male nurse from a female one.

Biological sex is conceptually distinct from gender, although they are often used interchangeably. The adjective female can describe a person's sex or gender identity.

The word can also refer to the shape of connectors and fasteners, such as screws, electrical pins, and technical equipment. Under this convention, sockets and receptacles are called female, and the corresponding plugs male.

== Defining characteristics ==
Females produce ova, the usually larger gametes in a heterogamous reproduction system, while the smaller and usually motile gametes, the spermatozoa, are produced by males. Generally, a female cannot reproduce sexually without access to the gametes of a male, and vice versa, but in some species females can reproduce by themselves asexually, for example via parthenogenesis.

Patterns of sexual reproduction include:

- Isogamous species with two or more mating types with gametes of identical form and behavior (but different at the molecular level),
- Anisogamous species with gametes of male and female types,
- Oogamous species, which include humans, in which the female gamete is much larger than the male and has no ability to move. Oogamy is a form of anisogamy. There is an argument that this pattern was driven by the physical constraints on the mechanisms by which two gametes get together as required for sexual reproduction.

Other than the defining difference in the type of gamete produced, differences between males and females in one lineage cannot always be predicted by differences in another. The concept is not limited to animals; egg cells are produced by chytrids, diatoms, water moulds and land plants, among others. In land plants, female and male designate not only the egg- and sperm-producing organisms and structures, but also the structures of the sporophytes that give rise to male and female plants.

== Females across species ==
Species that are divided into females and males are classified as gonochoric in animals, as dioecious in seed plants and as dioicous in cryptogams.

In some species, female and hermaphrodite individuals may coexist, a sexual system termed gynodioecy. In a few species, female individuals coexist with males and hermaphrodites; this sexual system is called trioecy. In Thor manningi (a species of shrimp), females coexist with males and protandrous hermaphrodites.

=== Mammalian female ===
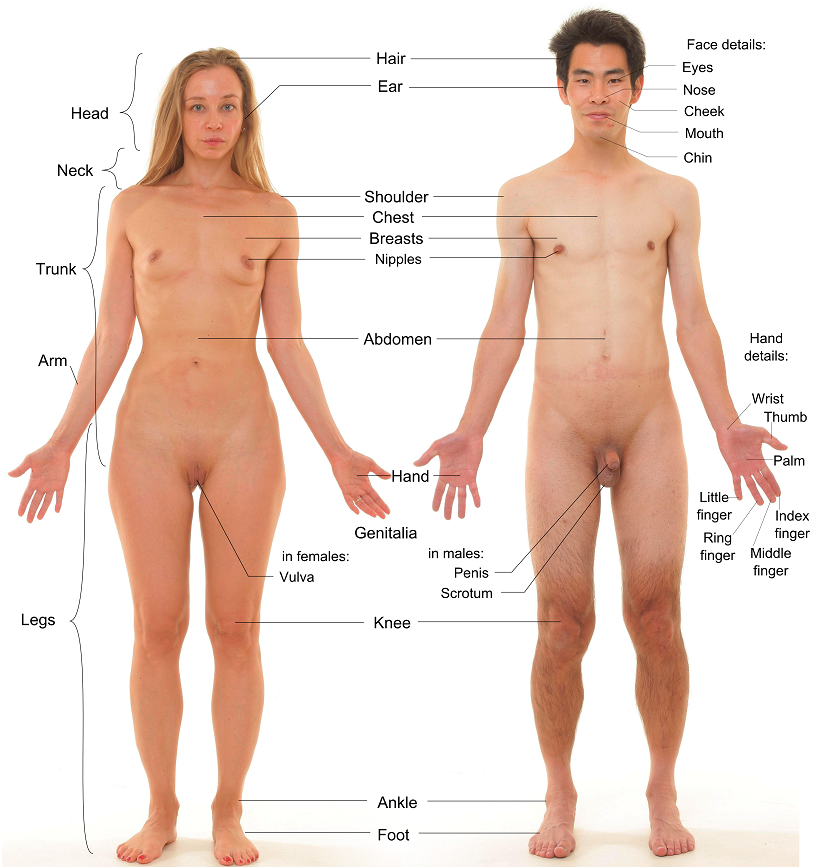
Photograph of an adult female human, with an adult male for comparison. (Both models have partially shaved body hair to show anatomy, i.e., clean-shaven pubic regions.)

A distinguishing characteristic of the class Mammalia is the presence of mammary glands. Mammary glands are modified sweat glands that produce milk, which is used to feed the young for some time after birth. Only mammals produce milk. Mammary glands are obvious in humans, because the female human body stores large amounts of fatty tissue near the nipples, resulting in prominent breasts. Mammary glands are present in all mammals, although they are normally redundant in males of the species.

Most mammalian females have two copies of the X chromosome, while males have only one X and one smaller Y chromosome; some mammals, such as the platypus, have different combinations. One of the female's X chromosomes is randomly inactivated in each cell of placental mammals while the paternally derived X is inactivated in marsupials. In birds and some reptiles, by contrast, it is the female which is heterozygous and carries a Z and a W chromosome while the male carries two Z chromosomes. In mammals, females can have XXX or X.

Mammalian females bear live young, with the exception of monotreme females, which lay eggs. Some non-mammalian species, such as guppies, have analogous reproductive structures; and some other non-mammals, such as some sharks, also bear live young.

Following experiments by French endocrinologist Alfred Jost in the 1940s, it is widely believed that the female is the default sex in mammalian sexual determination. However, this idea was called into question by a 2017 study.

== Sex determination ==
The sex of a particular organism may be determined by genetic or environmental factors, or may naturally change during the course of an organism's life.

=== Genetic determination ===
The sex of most mammals, including humans, is genetically determined by the XY sex-determination system where females have XX (as opposed to XY in males) sex chromosomes. It is also possible in a variety of species, including humans, to have other karyotypes. During reproduction, the male contributes either an X sperm or a Y sperm, while the female always contributes an X egg. A Y sperm and an X egg produce a male, while an X sperm and an X egg produce a female. The ZW sex-determination system, where females have ZW (as opposed to ZZ in males) sex chromosomes, is found in birds, reptiles and some insects and other organisms.

=== Environmental determination ===
The young of some species develop into one sex or the other depending on local environmental conditions, e.g. the sex of crocodilians is influenced by the temperature of their eggs. Other species (such as the goby) can transform, as adults, from one sex to the other in response to local reproductive conditions (such as a brief shortage of males).

In many arthropods, sex is determined by infection with parasitic, endosymbiotic bacteria of the genus Wolbachia. The bacterium can only be transmitted via infected ova, and the presence of the obligate endoparasite may be required for female sexual viability.

== Evolution ==
The question of how females evolved is mainly a question of why males evolved. The first organisms reproduced asexually, usually via binary fission, wherein a cell splits itself in half. From a strict numbers perspective, a species that is half males/half females can produce half the offspring an asexual population can, because only the females are having offspring. Being male can also carry significant costs, such as in flashy sexual displays in animals (such as big antlers or colorful feathers), or needing to produce an outsized amount of pollen as a plant in order to get a chance to fertilize a female. Yet despite the costs of being male, there must be some advantage to the process.

The advantages are explained by the evolution of anisogamy, which led to the evolution of male and female function. Before the evolution of anisogamy, mating types in a species were isogamous: the same size and both could move, catalogued only as "+" or "-" types. In anisogamy, the mating cells are called gametes. The female gamete is larger than the male gamete, and usually immotile. Anisogamy remains poorly understood, as there is no fossil record of its emergence. Numerous theories exist as to why anisogamy emerged. Many share a common thread, in that larger female gametes are more likely to survive, and that smaller male gametes are more likely to find other gametes because they can travel faster. Current models often fail to account for why isogamy remains in a few species. Anisogamy appears to have evolved multiple times from isogamy; for example female Volvocales (a type of green algae) evolved from the plus mating type. Although sexual evolution emerged at least 1.2 billion years ago, the lack of anisogamous fossil records make it hard to pinpoint when females evolved.

Female sex organs (genitalia, in animals) have an extreme range of variation among species and even within species. The evolution of female genitalia remains poorly understood compared to male genitalia, reflecting a now-outdated belief that female genitalia are less varied than male genitalia, and thus less useful to study. The difficulty of reaching female genitalia has also complicated their study. New 3D technology has made female genital study simpler. Genitalia evolve very quickly. There are three main hypotheses as to what impacts female genital evolution: lock-and-key (genitals must fit together), cryptic female choice (females affect whether males can fertilize them), and sexual conflict (a sort of sexual arms race). There is also a hypothesis that female genital evolution is the result of pleiotropy, i.e. unrelated genes that are affected by environmental conditions like low food also affect genitals. That hypothesis is unlikely to apply to a significant number of species, but natural selection in general has some role in female genital evolution.

== Symbol ==
The symbol ♀ (Unicode: U+2640 Alt codes: Alt+12), a circle with a small cross underneath, is commonly used to represent females. Joseph Justus Scaliger once speculated that the symbol was associated with Venus, goddess of beauty, because it resembles a bronze mirror with a handle, but modern scholars consider that fanciful, and the most established view is that the female and male symbols derive from contractions in Greek script of the Greek names of the planets Thouros (Mars) and Phosphoros (Venus).

== See also ==
- Girl
- Pregnancy
- Femininity
- Lady
- Woman
