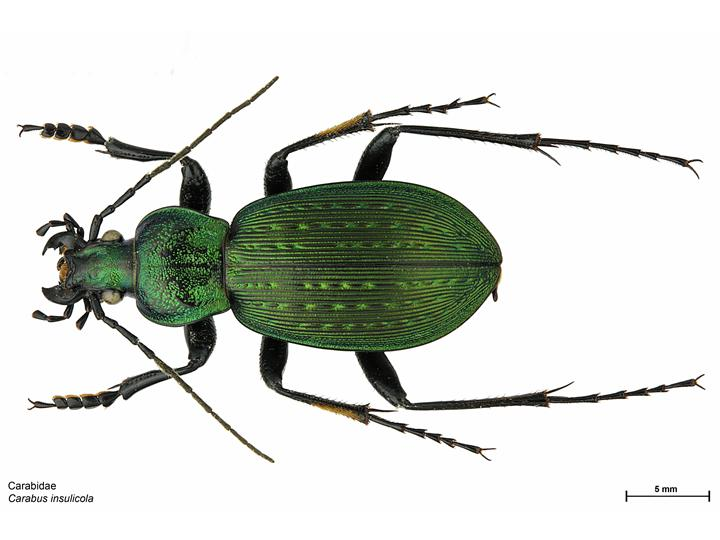

Scientific classification
- Kingdom: Animalia
- Phylum: Arthropoda
- Class: Insecta
- Order: Coleoptera
- Suborder: Adephaga
- Family: Carabidae
- Genus: Carabus
- Species: C. insulicola

Binomial name
- Carabus insulicola Chaudoir, 1869

= Carabus insulicola =

Species of beetle

Carabus insulicola is a species of black-colored beetle from the family Carabidae native to Japan. They are also known as ground beetles, and are oval shaped and elongated. They are black with a green metallic hue and vertical stripes running down their backs. The length of a fully grown beetle ranges from 27 to 31 mm. They have three pairs of legs and two pairs of wings. The outer wings are greatly degenerated, making them unable to fly. However, their relatively long legs allow them to walk and run fast. They have prominent mandibles that allow them to capture and eat prey.

This ground beetle species is most active during the summer, which is when their mating season occurs. Both females and males can mate with multiple partners during one mating season. This creates a unique situation for sperm competition to occur. Two methods that male C. insulicola use to increase their reproductive success are post-copulatory guarding and spermatophore displacement. Post-copulatory guarding is when a male remains on the female’s back after copulation, which increases the likelihood of the first mate fertilizing the eggs. Spermatophore displacement is when the second mate replaces the first mate’s spermatophore from the optimal position in the vagina with his own spermatophore, which increases his own chances of fertilizing the eggs. The male genitalia have evolved to make spermatophore displacement more efficient, but in response, female genitalia have coevolved to minimize female fitness costs.

== Geographic distribution and habitat ==
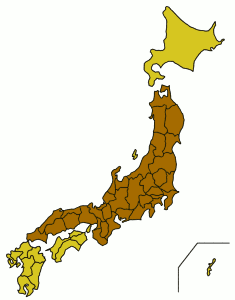
Honshu, Japan, where Carabus insulicula is found

These beetles are endemic to Japan. They are distributed across central and northeastern Honshu. They tend to dwell in lowland habitats like grasslands, open forests, riverbanks, and forest edges. They can be found under leaves, in the soil, or running on the ground. Larvae can be found under objects and debris on the ground, while pupae grow in cells made of soil buried a few inches underground.

== Food resources ==
C. insulicola are predatory beetles. They hunt smaller invertebrates for their primary food source, including snails, earthworms, and caterpillars. While adults feed on all of these invertebrates, larvae only eat earthworms. In laboratory experiments using C. insulicola, they can be fed minced beef and chopped apples to mimic their natural diet.

== Social behaviors ==
Ground beetles are nocturnal organisms, so they are most active at night. However, they can also be seen during the day. They are solitary beetles, as they only come together to mate and reproduce. There are no families or herds with C. insulicola. After a male and a female mate, they part ways, and males are not expected to help raise the offspring. It is also common for females to mate multiply, meaning they copulate with different males during the mating season. Multiple mating is often observed in species where the only investment a male makes towards the offspring is his sperm. This allows for sperm competition to occur, where the female can then ensure that her eggs will be fertilized and increase the genetic quality of her brood.

== Life cycle ==
There are four stages in the ground beetle’s lifespan. These stages are the egg stage, the larval stage, the pupal stage, and the adult stage. Eggs are laid in moist soil and take about eleven days to hatch. These eggs have an elliptical shape and grow to be around 6.6 mm in length. A ground beetle’s clutch size can vary from 30 to 600 eggs. After the eggs hatch, the larvae feed and grow for about a year until they mature. They will mature during the summer and then pupate in chambers made of soil. Because the pupal stage occurs in the soil, pupae are rarely observed. Adults emerge from the pupal stage in late summer to autumn, followed by hibernation throughout the winter without mating. These overwintered virgins then emerge in the spring, where they are ready to mate and reproduce. C. insulicola are univoltine, meaning there is one generation, or one brood of offspring laid, per year. Ground beetles can live for up to 2-3 years.

== Genital morphology ==
Male genitalia consist of an endophallus, aedeagus, and a copulatory piece. The copulatory piece is highly sclerotized and hook-like. It is attached to the dorsal wall of the endophallus. The spermatophore, a hemispherical capsule that contains sperm, is deposited through an opening at the end of the endophallus called the gonopore. Female genitalia are made up of a bursa copulatrix, dorsal lobe, spermatheca, oviduct, vaginal apophysis, and a vaginal appendix. This vaginal appendix is a pocket that is attached to the bursa copulatrix. During copulation, the copulatory piece and the vaginal appendix are the structures that are actually coupled. The bursa copulatrix is responsible for storing and digesting the spermatophore. The spermatheca is a skinny tube-like structure responsible for storing the sperm that is taken from the spermatophore as it is digested in the bursa copulatrix and fertilizing the eggs. Sperm can only be transferred to the spermatheca if the spermatophore is located at the innermost corner of the bursa copulatrix and attached to the vaginal apophysis.

C. insulicola are an example of a species that has evolved to have sexually antagonistic genitalia. Research has found that males have evolved to have longer copulatory pieces in order to increase their reproductive success. A longer copulatory piece could be used to displace previously deposited spermatophores from rival males, but females pay a fitness cost if they mate with a male with a long copulatory piece by laying unfertilized eggs, or egg dumping. In response, females have evolved to have longer vaginal appendixes. A longer vaginal appendix lessened this fitness cost by decreasing egg dumping and increasing fertilization. Therefore, while a longer copulatory piece benefits male fitness at the cost of female fitness, longer vaginal appendixes benefit female fitness at the cost of male reproductive success. This evolutionary tug of war results in coevolutionary divergence of male and female genitalia in C. insulicola. However, in the end, the more the lengths of the copulatory piece and vaginal appendix match, the more successful insemination will be.

== Mating ==
The mating season for C. insulicola spans from May to July. Overwintered virgins will come out of hibernation in the spring to look for mates. Mating is often separated into three stages: pre-copulation, copulation, and post-copulation.

=== Pre-copulation ===
Mating is initiated during the pre-copulatory stage by the male beetle mounting the female beetle’s back and gripping her body with his legs in a position called amplexus. At this point, his antennae will vibrate, and he will rub them on the female’s forebody and antennae to indicate his desire to copulate. His aedeagus will extend to its maximum length where he then will attempt to insert it into the female’s vaginal opening. The female can either exhibit behaviors attributed to a weak rejection, a strong rejection, or acquiescence. During a weak rejection, the female will extend segments of her abdomen to block the aedeagus from reaching the opening. For a strong rejection, she will bend her abdominal terminalia upwards to prevent deeper insertion of the aedeagus. Males facing a rejection will usually still try to coerce the female by rubbing her forebody and antennae with his vibrating antennae. Acquiescence occurs when the genitals are coupled and the female stops resisting the male, allowing him to copulate. Pre-copulation can last anywhere from 0 to approximately 49 seconds.

=== Copulation ===
During the copulation stage, the aedeagus enters the bursa copulatrix and the male’s copulatory piece is hooked inside the female’s vaginal appendix. The male remains on the female’s back as he continues to vibrate his antennae. The female will usually just walk around while copulation proceeds. Occasionally, the male will show thrusting movements of the aedeagus into the vagina. Once the genitals are coupled, though, they remain coupled until copulation is terminated. Copulation is terminated once the aedeagus is fully removed from the vaginal opening. This stage lasts, on average, anywhere between 80 and 100 minutes. An interesting behavior that has evolved in this species is spermatophore displacement. Sperm displacement is a tactic used by males of many species to ensure paternity when females mate multiply. The shape of the male’s copulatory piece has been thought to evolve the way it has in order to increase the ability of the male to displace previously deposited spermatophores. When a female mates multiply, the latest male’s spermatophore is the one that is ultimately located on the innermost part of the bursa copulatrix, making it closest to the spermatheca. This increases the chance of the second male’s sperm being used to fertilize the eggs. While spermatophore displacement is an effective offensive tactic for males, it is not a foolproof way to guarantee paternity. For one, the second male is not able to completely remove a spermatophore from the vaginal opening; he is only able to dislodge it and move his spermatophore closer to the inside. Secondly, the second male is unable to remove or neutralize the sperm within the first male’s spermatophore. This means that there is still a possibility that sperm could be transferred to the spermatheca during the time interval between the first and second copulation. This time interval is dictated by the third stage of mating: post-copulation.

=== Post-copulation ===
Post-copulation is defined as the time in between the termination of copulation and the departure of the male from the female’s back. A common behavior observed during this stage is what is called post-copulatory guarding. This also occurs in the amplexus position. Mate guarding can range from 0 - 180 minutes for C. insulicola, and it can be terminated voluntarily or involuntarily. Usually, the male will get off of the female, but in some cases, the female can shake the male off. It benefits the male to stay on for as long as possible because post-copulatory guarding increases the chance of paternity. Spermatophores are gradually digested over the span of 24 hours, where sperm can be transferred to the spermatheca within the first couple of hours after copulation. Therefore, the longer the first male can guard the female before the next mate comes, the greater the chance that his sperm would have made it to the spermatheca before the spermatophore is displaced by the second male. The success of the offensive tactic of spermatophore displacement depends on this defensive tactic of post-copulatory guarding. Spermatophore displacement ensures that the second male’s spermatophore will be closest to the spermatheca, but the longer that post-copulatory guarding lasts, the lower the paternity of the second male and the greater the fertilization success of the first male. The females also have a role in sperm competition. Sperm use by females is not random. Eggs laid earlier, or closer in time to the end of copulation, were more likely to be fertilized by the second male. It is not known why the female gives a fertilization advantage to the second male.
