= Maarten Larmuseau =

Belgian genetic genealogy

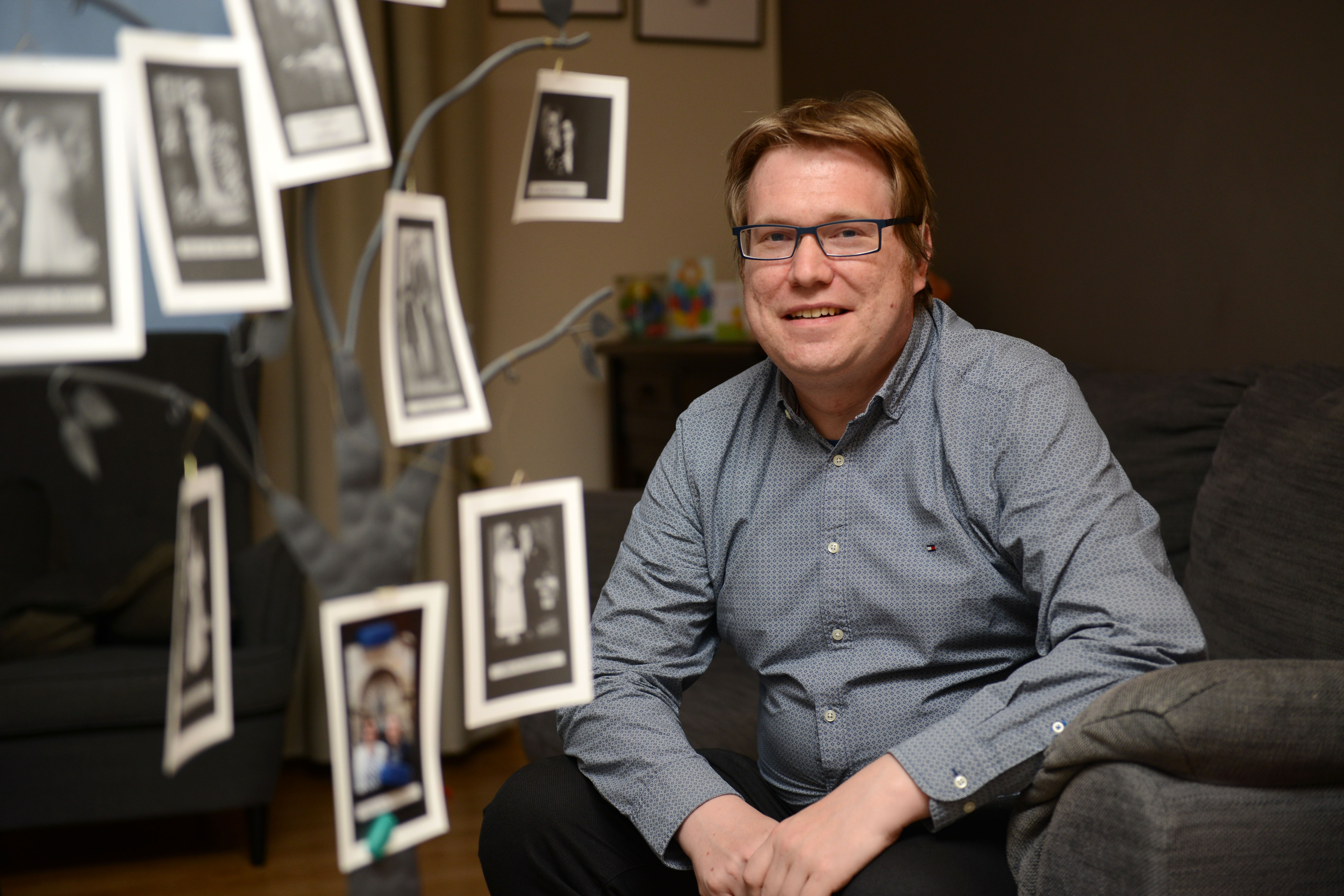
- Born: Maarten H. D. Larmuseau; 3 January 1983 (age 43); Zottegem, Belgium
- Education: KU Leuven
- Known for: Studies on historical non-paternity, citizen science in genetics, and ethical implications of genetic testing
- Scientific career
- Fields: Genetic genealogy Population genetics Evolutionary biology
- Workplaces: KU Leuven; University of Antwerp

Maarten H. D. Larmuseau (born 3 January 1983, Zottegem) is a Belgian biologist and genetic genealogist. He is a professor in genetic genealogy at KU Leuven and a guest professor in heritage studies at the University of Antwerp. His research combines population genetics, genealogy, and history to study the impact of biological relationships in human society. In 2025, the journal Science described him as the "paternity detective" for his pioneering work on historical extra-paternity rates and the use of DNA in reconstructing family histories.

== Education ==
Larmuseau studied biology and genetics at KU Leuven.

== Career and research ==
After his education he joined the Centre for Human Genetics at the faculty of medicine. He leads the Laboratory of Human Genetic Genealogy and collaborates with the heritage sciences programme at the University of Antwerp. At KU Leuven he is also the director of LIGAS - KU Leuven Institute of Genetics and Society.

Larmuseau's research integrates genetic data with genealogical and historical sources to explore human relatedness over long timescales. His work has examined:

- "Historical non-paternity rates" in European populations, using Y chromosome data and genealogical records to show that rates of extra-pair paternity have remained low (around 1–2%) over several centuries. His studies on extra-paternity have been featured internationally, including in Science and The New York Times.
- As a genetic genealogist, Larmuseau has contributed to several high-profile studies involving the genomic reconstruction or authentication of historical figures. He confirmed the identity of the remains of Albert I of Belgium, and disproved the attribution of famous relics believed to belong to Henry IV of France and Louis XVI of France. He also contributed to the genomic study of Ludwig van Beethoven, in which DNA from preserved hair locks revealed information about the composer's ancestry and health. Through Y chromosome analysis, Larmuseau and colleagues identified living relatives and uncovered a case of historical illegitimacy (non-paternity) in Beethoven's direct paternal line.
- The citizen science project MamaMito, involving thousands of participants tracing their maternal lineages through mitochondrial DNA analysis and archival research.
- Ancient DNA and population structure in medieval Europe to detect kinship patterns within Merovingian cemeteries and medieval cemeteries in Belgium.

He also explores the ethical and societal implications of direct-to-consumer genetic testing and unexpected DNA revelations.

== Selected publications ==
- Larmuseau, M. H. D. et al. (2019). "A historical-genetic reconstruction of human extra-pair paternity." Current Biology, 29(23): 4102–4107.
- Larmuseau, M.H.D. et al. (2016). "Cuckolded fathers rare in human populations." Trends in Ecology & Ecolution, 31(5): 327-329.
- Sasso, S. et al. (2024). "Capturing the fusion of two ancestries and kinship structures in Merovingian Flanders. PNAS, 121(27): e2406734121.
- Beneker, O. et al. (2025). "Urbanization and genetic homogenization in the medieval Low Countries revealed through a ten-century paleogenomic study of the city of Sint-Truiden. Genome Biology, 26: 127.
