= H. E. Hinton =

British entomologist (1912–1977)

Howard Hinton FRS
- Born: Howard Everest Hinton; 24 August 1912
- Died: 2 August 1977 (aged 64)
- Education: University of California, Berkeley (BS); University of Cambridge (PhD)
- Children: Geoffrey Hinton
- Scientific career
- Fields: Entomology
- Institutions: Natural History Museum, London; University of Bristol
- Thesis: An inquiry into the natural classification of some families of beetles, and a monographic revision of the Mexican water beetles of the family Elmidae (1939)
- Doctoral students: Robin Baker; Geoff Parker

Howard Everest Hinton FRS (24 August 1912 – 2 August 1977) was a British entomologist and professor who studied beetles.

== Education and early life ==
Howard Hinton grew up in Mexico and attended Modesto Junior College and the University of California, Berkeley as an undergraduate. He received his PhD from the University of Cambridge in 1939 for research on Mexican water beetles. During World War II he worked on the problem of storage of food products to counter the depredation of moths and beetles.

== Career ==
After his PhD, Hinton worked at the Natural History Museum, London. In 1949, he moved to the University of Bristol where he spent the rest of his career.

Hinton published more than 300 scientific papers, many of which were concerned with insect morphology and taxonomy. He founded and edited the Journal of Insect Physiology. He introduced an extra stage in the metamorphosis of insects, the pharate stage, in which the insect has produced a new exoskeleton in preparation for ecdysis but is still enclosed in the remnants of the old one.

He was an early proponent of continental drift, based on the close relationship between non-migratory water beetles of the family Elmidae in rivers in New Guinea and northern Australia. He worked extensively on insect eggs, particularly the way in which they respire. He worked for many years on cryptobiosis, experimenting with a species of African fly that could withstand long periods of dehydration, positing that this might also be the key to space voyaging.

In an article in New Scientist, October 1965 he suggested that contrary to the idea that life had evolved from the sea, complex molecules from the Earth's atmosphere might have survived long periods of desiccation before being washed down to the sea.

His graduate students include Robin Baker and Geoff Parker. His papers are stored at the University of Bristol, where he worked. Most of his insect collection is housed at the Natural History Museum, London.

=== Awards and honours ===
Hinton was elected as Fellow of the Royal Society (FRS) in 1961.

== Personal life ==
Howard Hinton married Margaret Clark, a teacher and sister of Colin Clark, in 1938. They had four children: Charlotte, who became a head teacher; James Hinton, who served as a professor of history at the University of Warwick; Geoffrey Hinton, a Turing and Nobel laureate who is a University Professor Emeritus of the University of Toronto; and Teresa, who is a social policy researcher in Tasmania.

Howard's father, George Hinton, was a mining engineer and botanist who managed a silver mine in Mexico and collected many new botanical specimens, some of which are in Kew Gardens. Howard Hinton's nephew, also called George Hinton, has a farm in Mexico and discovered a new genus of cacti, Geohintonia, that are named after him.

Howard Hinton was a great-grandson of George Boole, the founder of mathematical logic. His cousins include Joan Hinton, one of the few women scientists at Los Alamos who later moved to Beijing, and William Hinton who wrote Fanshen, a book about the Chinese Communist Revolution which he observed firsthand while working for the United Nations in China in 1949. His grandfather, Charles Howard Hinton was a mathematician who worked on the concept of four-dimensional space, and had to leave Victorian England when he was found guilty of bigamy.
