= Sperm heteromorphism =

Sperm heteromorphism is the simultaneous production of two or more distinguishable types of sperm by a single male. The sperm types might differ in size, shape and/or chromosome complement. Sperm heteromorphism is also called sperm polymorphism or sperm dimorphism (for species with two sperm types). Typically, only one sperm type is capable of fertilizing eggs. Fertile types have been called "eusperm" or "eupyrene sperm" and infertile types "parasperm" or "apyrene sperm".

One interpretation of sperm polymorphism is the "kamikaze sperm" hypothesis (Baker and Bellis, 1988), which has been widely discredited in humans. The kamikaze sperm hypothesis states that the polymorphism of sperm is due to a subdivision of sperm into different functional groups. There are those that defend the egg from fertilization by other male sperm, and those that fertilize the egg. However, there is no evidence that the polymorphism of human sperm is for the purpose of antagonizing rival sperm.

== Distribution ==
Sperm heteromorphism is known from several different groups of animals.

=== Insects ===
- Lepidoptera (i.e. butterflies and moths): Almost all known species produce two sperm types. The fertilizing type has a longer tail and contains a nucleus. The other type is shorter and lacks a nucleus, meaning it contains no genetic information at all.
- Drosophila (fruit-flies): the D. obscura group of species in the genus Drosophila is sperm heteromorphic. As with the Lepidoptera, there is a long, fertile type and a short, infertile type. However, the infertile type has a nucleus with a normal, haploid chromosome complement. It is not known why the shorter sperm are infertile, though it has been suggested that the slightly wider head of the infertile type might prevent it from entering the micropyle of the egg.
- Diopsidae (stalk-eyed flies): several species have a long, fertile type and a shorter infertile type.
- Carabidae (ground beetles): some species produce large, infertile sperm that may contain up to 100 sets of chromosomes.

=== Molluscs ===
- Some prosobranch gastropods (snails) produce two or three sperm types. The infertile types may be large "carrier" types the fertile sperm attach to for transport, or "lancet" types. The lancet sperm sometimes contain many lysosomes.

=== Fish ===
- Some Sculpin may be sperm heteromorphic. Their ejaculates appear to contain fertile sperm as well as disc-shaped, infertile sperm.

== Possible functions of sperm heteromorphism ==
=== Non-adaptive ===
The non-fertilising morph(s) have no function, and are simply developmental errors. This is thought to be unlikely in many sperm heteromorphic species because the production of infertile sperm may be highly regulated, and infertile sperm can make up >90% of the total sperm in some Lepidoptera and Drosophila.

=== Provisioning ===
The non-fertilising morph(s) are a means in which males can provide nutrition to the female, her eggs or the fertilising sperm.

=== Facilitation ===
The non-fertilising sperm help the fertilising sperm by assisting their sexual transport or capacitation (i.e. the acquisition of fertilisation competence). This has been demonstrated in Bombyx mori.

In silkworms, there is good evidence that fertile sperm are unable to fertilise if the non-fertile sperm are not present. The researchers artificially inseminated fertile sperm, non-fertile sperm or a mixture of both. Only the last group resulted in offspring production.

=== Sperm competition ===
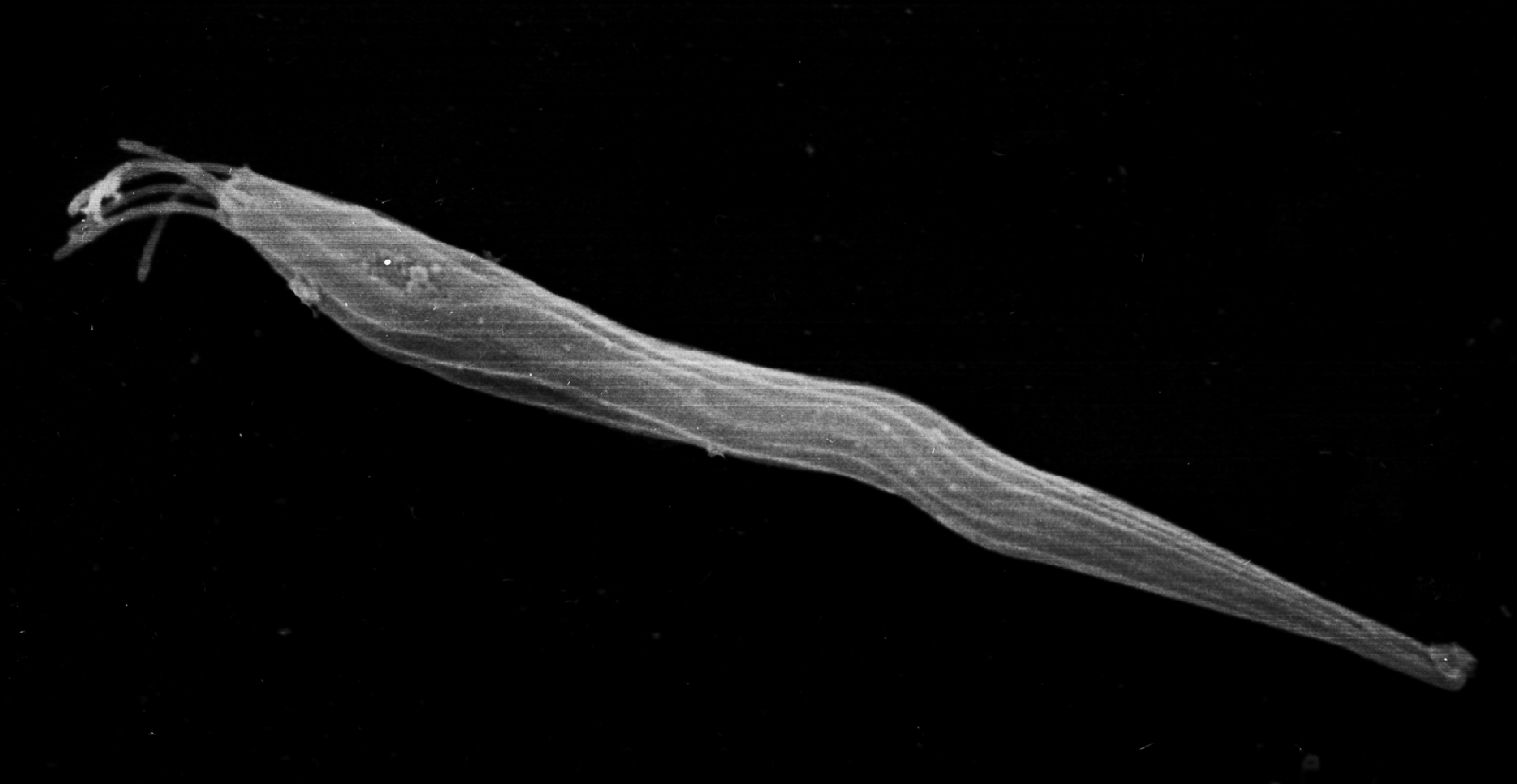
Scanning electron microscopic image of immature parasperm lancet (infertile sperm morph) of Fusitriton oregonensis showing the tail brush still present, which later develops into part of the body of the parasperm. It is producing when sperm competition occurs.

Non-fertile sperm increase the fertilisation success of the male producing them when sperm competition occurs. This might be offensive (e.g. displacing or even killing rival fertilising sperm) or defensive (e.g. by blocking areas of the female tract or creating a hostile pre-fertilisation environment).

=== "Cheap filler" ===
Non-fertile sperm delay or prevent the female mating again, thus allowing the male producing the non-fertile sperm a greater share of the paternity of her offspring (because the male avoids Sperm competition). For example, sperm might fill up the sperm storage organs so that female "perceives" that she does not need to re-mate to obtain more sperm. Alternatively, the sperm may transfer chemicals similar to sex peptide, a chemical carried on the sperm of Drosophila melanogaster that makes females less likely to accept mates (i.e. it is an anti-aphrodesiac).

There is correlational evidence for this theory in a butterfly, Pieris napi. Females that were receptive to a second mating had fewer of the non-fertile sperm type in storage than did non-receptive females. Thus, the infertile sperm may be responsible for delaying female remating.

This theory was also tested in the fruit-fly Drosophila pseudoobscura, but the results suggested that "cheap filler" was not important in that species.
