= Association for the Study of Animal Behaviour =

- Abbreviation: ASAB
- Formation: January 1, 1936; 90 years ago
- Location: London
- Key people: Pat Monaghan; Jane Hurst; Julian Huxley; Geoffrey Matthews; Christopher J. Barnard
- Website: asab.org

The Association for the Study of Animal Behaviour (ASAB) is a British organization founded in 1936 to promote ethology and the study of animal behaviour. ASAB holds conferences, offers grants, and publishes a peer-reviewed journal, Animal Behaviour, first published in 1953. The journal is published in collaboration with the Animal Behavior Society. The CCAB accreditation formerly run through ASAB is now managed by a new separate company, CCAB Certification Ltd.

ASAB recognises excellence in teaching and research with awards including the ASAB Medal and Christopher Barnard Award. The annual Tinbergen Lecturer is invited by ASAB Council, and gives an invited presentation at the ASAB Winter Meeting held in London each year.

ASAB was founded in London on 13 March 1936 as the Institute for the Study of Animal Behaviour. Julian Huxley was the first president and Solly Zuckerman the first editor of its earlier publication, Bulletin of Animal Behaviour, which began publishing in October 1938. Other past presidents include Geoffrey Matthews (1971–1974), Christopher J. Barnard (2004–2007) Jane Hurst (2010-2012) and Pat Monaghan (2017-2019) .

Melissa Bateson, Professor in Ethology at the Newcastle University, is President of the ASAB Council as of January 2024.

== Conferences ==
ASAB organises 3 conferences a year, the Winter and Spring conferences are typically held in the UK, the ASAB summer meeting in even-numbered years is a joint meeting with the European Conference on Behavioural Biology (ECBB), and in odd-numbered years is a joint meeting with Behaviour.

Meeting	Year	Location
Summer	2002	Münster, Germany
Winter	2002	London, England
Spring	2003	Leeds, England
Summer	2003	Grünau, Germany
Winter	2003	London, England
Spring	2004	Sussex, England
Summer	2004	Groningen, Netherlands
Winter	2004	London, England
Spring	2005	Norwich, England
Summer	2005	Lancaster, England
Winter	2005	London, England
Spring	2006	Nottingham, England
Summer	2006	Belfast, Northern Ireland
Winter	2006	London, England
Spring	2007	Falmouth, England
Summer	2007	Newcastle, England
Winter	2007	London, England
Spring	2008	Edinburgh, Scotland
Summer	2008	Dijon, France
Winter	2008	London, England
Spring	2009	Cardiff, England
Summer	2009	Oxford, England
Winter	2009	London, England
Spring	2010	Exeter, England
Summer	2010	Ferrara, Italy
Winter	2010	London, England
Spring	2011	Cambridge, England
Summer	2011	St. Andrews, Scotland
Winter	2011	London, England
Spring	2012	Aberystwyth, Wales
Summer	2012	Essen, Germany
Winter	2012	London, England
Spring	2013	Lincoln, England
Summer	2013	Newcastle/Gateshead, England
Winter	2013	London, England
Spring	2014	Sheffield, England
Summer	2014	Prague, Czech Republic
Winter	2014	London, England
Spring	2015	Durham, England
Summer	2015	Lincoln, England
Winter	2015	London, England
Spring	2016	Aberystwyth, Wales
Summer	2016	Vienna, Austria
Winter	2016	London, England
Spring	2017	Liverpool, England
Summer	2017	Estoril, Portugal
Winter	2017	London, England
Spring	2018	Plymouth, England
Summer	2018	Liverpool, England
Winter	2018	London, England
Spring	2019	York, England
Summer	2019	Konstanz, Germany
Winter	2019	London, England
Spring	2020	Cancelled due to COVID-19
Summer	2020	Virtual
Winter	2020	Virtual
Spring	2021	Virtual, Bristol, England
Summer	2021	Belfast, Northern Ireland
Winter	2021	Virtual
Spring	2022	Newcastle, England
Summer	2022	Groningen, Netherlands
Winter	2022	Edinburgh, Scotland
Spring	2023	Bangor, Wales
Summer	2023	Bielefeld, Germany
Winter	2023	Edinburgh, Scotland
Spring	2024	Exeter, England
Summer	2024	Zurich, Switzerland
Winter	2024	Edinburgh, Scotland
Spring	2025	Liverpool, England
Summer	2025	Kolkata, India
Winter	2025	Edinburgh, Scotland
Spring	2026	Bristol, England
Summer	2026	Cambridge, England
Winter	2026	Edinburgh, Scotland

== Society presidents ==
List of former presidents of the society

- 2024–present Prof Melissa Bateson
- 2020-2023 Prof David Hosken
- 2016-2019 Prof Pat Monaghan, FRS
- 2013-2015 Prof Tim Birkhead, FRS
- 2010-2012 Prof Jane Hurst, OBE FRSB
- 2007-2009 Prof Innes Cuthill
- 2004-2006 Prof Christopher Barnard
- 2001-2003 Prof Felicity Huntingford, FRSE
- 1998-2000 Prof Robert Elwood, MRIA
- 1995-1997 Prof Linda Partridge, CBE FRS FRSE
- 1993-1994 Prof John Krebs, FRS
- 1989-1992 Sir Neil Chalmers
- 1986-1988 Prof Peter Slater, FRSE
- 1983-1985 Prof Aubrey Manning, OBE FRSE
- 1977-1980 Prof Sir P. Patrick Bateson, FRS
- 1971-1974 Prof Geoffrey Matthews, OBE
- 1936- Prof Julian Huxley, FRS

== Tinbergen Lecture ==
The annual Tinbergen Lecturer is invited by ASAB Council, and gives an invited presentation at the ASAB Winter Meeting.

- 2025 - T Suzuki
- 2024 - Cancelled
- 2023 - G Valortigara
- 2022 - N Clayton
- 2021 - D Biro
- 2020 - L Chittka
- 2019 - R Kilner
- 2018 - B Kempenaers
- 2017 - C Nicol
- 2016 - A Kacelnik
- 2015 - N Wedell
- 2014 - I Cuthill
- 2013 - M Zuk
- 2012 - A Cockburn
- 2011 - Cancelled
- 2010 - L Keller
- 2009 - K Lessells
- 2008 - P Slater
- 2007 M Kirkpatrick
- 2006 P Monaghan
- 2005 PK McGregor
- 2004 T Birkhead
- 2003 T Clutton-Brock
- 2002 - M Dawkins
- 2001 - FA Huntingford
- 2000 - R Dawkins
- 1999 - B Hölldobler
- 1998 - M Land
- 1997 - NB Davies
- 1996 - S Daan
- 1995 - GA Parker
- 1994 - F Nottebohm
- 1993 - L Partridge
- 1992 - E Curio
- 1991 - JR Krebs
- 1990 - JD Delius
- 1989 - PPG Bateson
- 1988 - ST Emlen
- 1987 - A Manning
- 1986 - J Aschoff
- 1985 - P Marler
- 1984 - FA Beach
- 1983 - JP Ewert
- 1982 - H Kummer
- 1981 - SJ Gould
- 1980 - WD Hamilton
- 1979 - J Bowlby
- 1978 - RA Hinde
- 1977 - F Huber
- 1976 - J Maynard-Smith
- 1975 - JP Baerends
- 1974 - WH Thorpe

== ASAB Medal ==
The ASAB Medal is awarded annually for contributions to the science of animal behaviour - through teaching, writing, broadcasting, research, or for work on behalf of the association. There is no limit on the age or career stage of the recipient. The medal is usually awarded at the ASAB Winter Meeting. The medal itself is cast in bronze and was designed by Jonathan Kingdon.

List of ASAB Medallists:

- 2025 - H Kokko
- 2024 - R Kilner
- 2023 - B Hatchwell
- 2022 - N Clayton
- 2021 - A Magurran
- 2020 - L Simmons
- 2019 - A Kacelnik
- 2018 - I Cuthill
- 2017 - J Hurst
- 2016 - K Lessells
- 2015 - P Monaghan
- 2014 - T Clutton-Brock
- 2013 - A Houston & J McNamara
- 2012 - T Birkhead
- 2011 - A Grafen
- 2010 - M Dockery
- 2009 - M Stamp Dawkins
- 2008 - C Barnard
- 2007 - R Elwood
- 2006 - F Huntingford
- 2005 - L Partridge
- 2004 - J Alcock
- 2003 - J Wingfield
- 2002 - GA Parker
- 2001 - PPG Bateson
- 2000 - JR Krebs
- 1999 - PJB Slater
- 1998 - AWG Manning
- 1997 - RA Hinde
- 1996 - NB Davies
- 1995 - J Maynard Smith

== Christopher Barnard Award ==
The Christopher Barnard Award for outstanding contributions by a new investigator is given each year to acknowledge and reward the achievements of such researchers. Recipients of the award give an invited presentation at the ASAB Spring Meeting, which is traditionally a postgraduate and early-career researcher focussed conference.

Recipients of the Award:

- 2026 - P Kennedy
- 2025 - L Samuni
- 2024 - N Mizumoto
- 2023 - D Fisher
- 2022 - L Aplin
- 2021 - N Boogert
- 2020 - H Mumby
- 2019 - E Ringler
- 2018 - D Farine
- 2017 - L Kelley
- 2016 - L Brent
- 2015 - J Perry
- 2014 - M Wolf
- 2013 - C Ioannou
- 2012 - J Skelhorn
- 2011 - S Pryke
- 2010 - A Gardner
- 2009 - T Uller
- 2008 - H Brumm
- 2007 - J Evans
- 2006 - V Lummaa
- 2005 - T Pizzari
- 2004 - O Krüger
- 2003 - R Brooks
- 2002 - T Tregenza
- 2001 - R Kilner
- 2000 - H Kokko
- 1999 - J Swaddle
- 1998 - B Sheldon
- 1997 - R Johnstone
