= Christopher Barnard =

Christopher Barnard may refer to:

- Chris Barnard (footballer) (born 1947), Welsh footballer
- Christopher J. Barnard (1952–2007), British evolutionary biologist
