= Tinbergen Lecture =

- Awarded for: “The annual Tinbergen Lecturer is invited by ASAB Council, and gives an invited presentation at the ASAB Winter Meeting held in London each year”
- Sponsored by: Association for the Study of Animal Behaviour (ASAB)
- First award: 1974
- Website: www.asab.org/tinbergen-lecturer

The Tinbergen Lecture is an academic prize lecture awarded by the Association for the Study of Animal Behaviour (ASAB).

== Lecturers ==
- 1974 W.H. Thorpe
- 1975 G.P. Baerends
- 1976 J. Maynard Smith
- 1977 F. Huber
- 1978 R.A. Hinde
- 1979 J. Bowlby
- 1980 W.D. Hamilton
- 1981 S.J. Gould
- 1982 H. Kummer
- 1983 Jörg-Peter Ewert
- 1984 Frank A. Beach
- 1985 Peter Marler
- 1986 Jürgen Aschoff
- 1987 Aubrey Manning
- 1988 Stephen T. Emlen
- 1989 P.P.G. Bateson
- 1990 J.D. Delius
- 1991 John R. Krebs
- 1992 E. Curio
- 1993 Linda Partridge
- 1994 Fernando Nottebohm
- 1995 G.A. Parker
- 1996 Serge Daan
- 1997 N.B. Davies
- 1998 Michael Land
- 1999 Bert Hölldobler
- 2000 Richard Dawkins
- 2001 Felicity Huntingford
- 2002 Marian Dawkins
- 2003 Tim Clutton-Brock
- 2004 Tim Birkhead
- 2005 P.K. McGregor
- 2006 Pat Monaghan
- 2007 M. Kirkpatrick
- 2008 Peter Slater
- 2009 Kate Lessells
- 2010 Laurent Keller
- 2011 Cancelled
- 2012 A Cockburn
- 2013 Marlene Zuk
- 2014 Innes Cuthill
- 2015 Nina Wedell
- 2016 Alex Kacelnik
- 2017 Christine Nicol
- 2018 Bart Kempenaers
- 2019 Rebecca Kilner
- 2020 Lars Chittka
- 2021 Dora Biro
- 2022 Nicola Clayton
- 2023 Giorgio Vallortigara
- 2024 Cancelled
- 2025 Toshitaka Suzuki
- 2026 Phyllis Lee
