= ASAB Medal =

Scientific award given by the Association for the Study of Animal Behaviour

- Awarded for: “for contributions to the science of animal behaviour - through teaching, writing, broadcasting, research, through fostering any of these activities, or through contributing to the affairs of ASAB itself”
- Sponsored by: Association for the Study of Animal Behaviour (ASAB)
- First award: 1995
- Website: www.asab.org/asab-medal

The ASAB Medal is a scientific award given by the Association for the Study of Animal Behaviour (ASAB). It is cast in bronze to a design by Jonathan Kingdon, awarded "annually for contributions to the science of animal behaviour - through teaching, writing, broadcasting, research, through fostering any of these activities, or through contributing to the affairs of ASAB itself."

== ASAB Medallists ==
- 1995 John Maynard Smith
- 1996 Nicholas B. Davies
- 1997 Robert A. Hinde
- 1998 Aubrey W.G. Manning
- 1999 Peter J.B. Slater
- 2000 John R. Krebs
- 2001 P.P.G. Bateson
- 2002 Geoffrey A. Parker
- 2003 John C. Wingfield
- 2004 John Alcock
- 2005 Linda Partridge
- 2006 Felicity Huntingford
- 2007 Robert Elwood
- 2008 Christopher John Barnard
- 2009 Marian Stamp Dawkins
- 2010 Michael Dockery
- 2011 Alan Grafen
- 2012 Tim Birkhead
- 2013 Alasdair Houston and John McNamara
- 2014 Tim Clutton-Brock
- 2015 Pat Monaghan
- 2016 Kate Lessells
- 2017 Jane Hurst
- 2018 Innes Cuthill
- 2019 Alex Kacelnik
- 2020 Leigh Simmons
- 2021 Anne Magurran
- 2022 Nicola Clayton
- 2023 Ben Hatchwell
- 2024 Rebecca Kilner
- 2025 Hanna Kokko
