= John McNamara (mathematical biologist) =

English mathematical biologist

- Education: Oxford University; University of Sussex
- Known for: Behavioural ecology Mathematical biology
- Awards: (with Alasdair Houston) ASAB Medal (2013); Weldon Memorial Prize (2014); Sewall Wright Award (2018); Frink Medal (2018)
- Scientific career
- Fields: Biology; Ecology; Mathematics
- Institutions: University of Bristol
- Thesis: Stability of the inner horizon of the Reissner-Nordstrõm and Kerr black hole models (1977)
- Doctoral advisor: Roger Penrose

John M. McNamara is an English mathematical biologist and Emeritus Professor of Mathematics and Biology in the School of Mathematics at the University of Bristol. He was elected a fellow of the Royal Society in 2012. In 2013, he and Alasdair Houston jointly received the ASAB Medal, and in 2014, he received the Weldon Memorial Prize. In 2018, he was awarded the Sewall Wright Award from the American Society of Naturalists.
