= Jane Hurst =

Animal scientist and behavioural ecologist

Jane Hurst FRSB
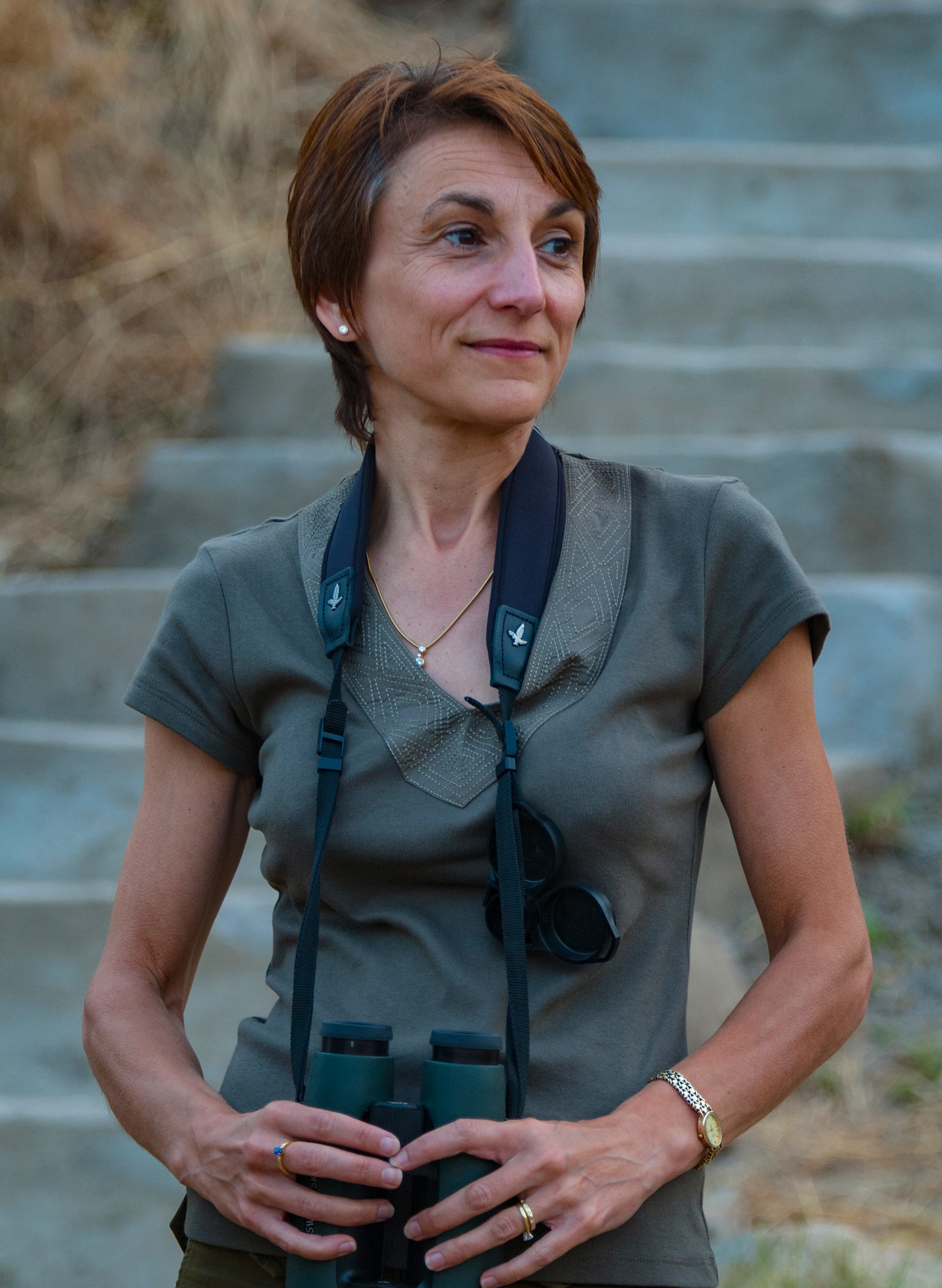
- Born: Jane Louise Hurst
- Education: University of Birmingham (BSc, PhD)
- Known for: Behavioural ecology
- Awards: ASAB Medal (2017); NC3Rs Prize (2010); Swiss Laboratory Animal Science Association Prize (2019); OBE (2020); UFAW Medal (2022); Frink Medal (2023)
- Scientific career
- Fields: Chemical communication Pheromones; Laboratory animal welfare Cooperation; Kin recognition
- Workplaces: University of Nottingham; University of Liverpool
- Thesis: The behavioural ecology of the house mouse (Mus domesticus) (1984)
- Website: www.liverpool.ac.uk/mammalian-behaviour-and-evolution/team/jane-hurst/

Jane Louise Hurst OBE FRSB is the William Prescott Professor of Animal Science at the University of Liverpool. She is Head of Mammalian Behaviour & Evolution. She studies scent communication between mammals, as well as animal welfare and pest control. She served as the president of the Association for the Study of Animal Behaviour from 2010 to 2012.

== Early life and education ==
Hurst earned her bachelor's degree in science at the University of Birmingham. She was inspired to study behavioural ecology after reading Mice All Over by Peter Crowcroft. She earned her PhD in 1984 on the behavioural ecology of the house mouse Mus domesticus. Hurst became inspired after discovering Peter Crowcroft's book "Mice All Over". During her PhD she watched wild mice in agricultural buildings, studying their social organisation and ability to live at such high population densities.

== Research and career ==
Hurst joined the University of Nottingham as a postdoctoral researcher in 1985, obtained a Science and Engineering Research Council (SERC) Postdoctoral Research Fellowship from 1986 to 1988, a SERC Advanced Fellowship from 1989 to 1984 and an Agricultural and Food Research Council (AFRC)/BBSRC Advanced Fellowship from 1994 to 1998. Hurst works on the mechanisms and evolution of scent communication in animals. She is interested in the roles of volatile and non-volatile scents. She was appointed the William Prescott Professor of Animal Science at the University of Liverpool in 1998 and Head of Mammalian Behaviour & Evolution Group.

Her main research interests are in the chemobiology of competitive signalling in mammals. Hurst became interested in the signals that determine animal mate choice. She is interested in how scents are used in sexual communications. She demonstrated that the quality of an animal's odour determines the chances that it will be selected as a mate. She found that female mice prefer to nest with their sisters, irrespective of whether they knew each other before. Specifically, female house mice prefer partners that share their own major urinary protein genotype. In the absence of this phenotype match, females preferred partners with whom they share multiple-loci across the genome.

Hurst identified a non-volatile pheromone that was released in male urine that female mice find highly attractive. She went on to find that this pheromone was a major urinary protein (MUP20), which she named darcin after Mr Darcy in Jane Austen's novel Pride and Prejudice. Hurst went on to establish that this pheromone could stimulate both short and long-term learning and that darcin and other major urinary proteins influence the odour signature that female mice learn. She also showed that darcin increased neurogenesis in the olfactory bulb and hippocampus. and has been involved with work that has identified a genetically determined circuit extending from the accessory olfactory bulb to the posterior medial amygdala mediating all behavioural responses to darcin. Hurst found that female mice are more attracted to male mice with their own territory. She found that darcin and other major urinary proteins influence the odour signature that female mice learn. She edited volume 11 of Chemical Signals in Vertebrates that followed a conference of the same name in Chester, UK. For her work on scent communication, Hurst was awarded the Zoological Society of London Frink Medal in 2023.

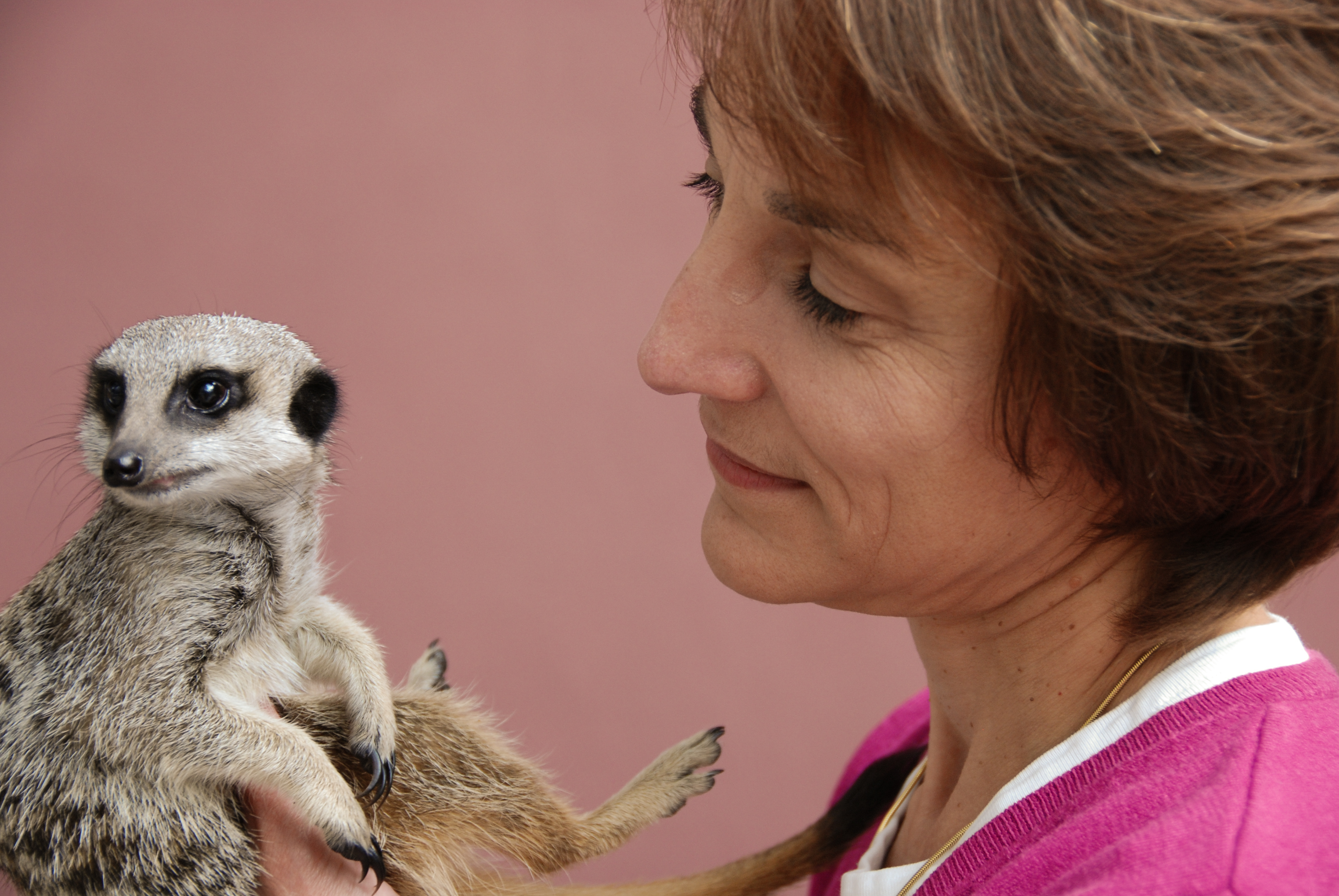
Professor Jane Hurst, William Prescott Professor of Animal Science

Her research is directed in part to the development of humane control of rodent pests. She also identified non-aversive handling methods that would reduce anxiety in mice, allowing them to be more reliable in laboratory tests. Hurst developed the use of mouse-friendly handling tunnels, reducing their anxiety and allowing them to explore more during animal testing. Hurst is also interested in how animals can detect scent-cues of ill-health and disease. ] For this work, she was awarded the NC3Rs prize in 2010. Hurst is also interested in how animals can detect scent-cues of ill-health and disease.

In 2010 Hurst was appointed President for the Association for the Study of Animal Behaviour (ASAB). She has supported the Biotechnology and Biological Sciences Research Council (BBSRC) from 2000 – 2019 by serving on grant funding and strategy advisory panels, Appointments Board, and chaired the BBSRC Animal Welfare Programme steering committee. She has supported the National Centre for the Replacement, Refinement and Reduction of Animals in Research since its inception, including a founding member of the NC3Rs Board and grant funding panel (2004-2010). She has served on the Council for the Universities Federation for Animal Welfare (UFAW, 1996-2002), on the Royal Society Use of Animals in Research committee (2004-2009) and the Ethical committee for ASAB (1991-1999, chair from 1995). Hurst has been involved with several studies to improve connections between researchers in the animal welfare community. Hurst discussed her pheromone research on In Our Time in 2019. In 2021 she was the guest on an episode of the BBC Radio 4 programme, The Life Scientific.

== Awards and honours ==
Her awards and honours include:

- 2017 ASAB Medal from the Association for the Study of Animal Behaviour
- 2010 National Centre for the Replacement, Refinement and Reduction of Animals in Research 3Rs Prize
- 2019 Swiss Laboratory Animal Science Association Prize for Refinement
- 2022 Universities Federation for Animal Welfare (UFAW) Medal for Outstanding Contributions to Animal Welfare Science
- 2023 Zoological Society of London (ZSL) Frink Medal 'For significant and original contributions by a professional zoologist to the development of zoology'

She was appointed Officer of the Order of the British Empire (OBE) in the 2020 New Year Honours for services to animal welfare.
