= Chris Barnard (disambiguation) =

Christiaan Barnard (1922–2001) was a South African surgeon.

Chris Barnard may also refer to:

- Chris Barnard (author) (1939–2015), South African author
- Chris Barnard (footballer) (1947–2025), Welsh footballer
