= Alasdair Houston =

English evolutionary biologist

- Born: Alasdair Iain Houston; England
- Education: University of Oxford
- Known for: Behavioural ecology
- Awards: (with John McNamara) ASAB Medal (2013)
- Scientific career
- Fields: Ecology; Evolutionary biology
- Institutions: University of Bristol
- Thesis: Models of animal motivation (1977)

Alasdair Iain Houston is an English evolutionary biologist and ecologist known for his work in behavioural ecology. He is Emeritus Professor in the School of Biological Sciences at the University of Bristol. He was elected a fellow of the Royal Society in 2012.
