= Animal Behaviour (journal) =

- Discipline: Ethology
- Language: English
- Edited by: L. Barrett, W.A. Searcy

Publication details
- Former name: The British Journal of Animal Behaviour
- History: 1953–present
- Publisher: Elsevier
- Impact factor: 2.844 (2020)

Standard abbreviations
- ISO 4: Anim. Behav.

Indexing
- CODEN: ANBEA8
- ISSN: 0003-3472 (print); 1095-8282 (web)
- LCCN: 56002267
- OCLC no.: 04699737

Links
- Journal homepage; Online access; Online archive of The British Journal of Animal Behaviour

Animal Behaviour is a double-blind peer-reviewed scientific journal established in 1953 as The British Journal of Animal Behaviour, before obtaining its current title in 1958. It is published monthly by Elsevier for the Association for the Study of Animal Behaviour in collaboration with the Animal Behavior Society. It covers all aspects of ethology, including behavioural ecology, evolution of behaviour, sociobiology, ethology, behavioural physiology, population biology, and navigation and migration.

== Abstracting and indexing ==
The journal is abstracted and indexed in EMBiology, Scopus, and the Science Citation Index. According to the Journal Citation Reports, the journal has a 2020 impact factor of 2.844.
