= Pat Monaghan =

British ornithologist

Pat Monaghan FRS FRSE MAE
- Born: Patricia Monaghan
- Education: Durham University (PhD)
- Known for: Regius Professor of Zoology
- Awards: Godman-Salvin Medal (2017); Frink Medal (2017); ASAB Medal (2015); Tinbergen Lecture (2006); Witherby Memorial Lecture (2004)
- Scientific career
- Fields: Behavioural ecology avian ecology Ornithology; Molecular ecology Senescence
- Workplaces: University of Glasgow
- Thesis: The utilisation of urban resources by the herring gull (Larus arqentatus) (1977)
- Academic advisors: J. C. Coulson
- Website: www.gla.ac.uk/researchinstitutes/bahcm/staff/patmonaghan/patmonaghan

Patricia Monaghan is a British ornithologist who is Regius Professor of Zoology in the School of biodiversity, one health & veterinary medicine at the University of Glasgow.

== Education ==
Monaghan was educated at Durham University where her PhD investigated the utilisation of urban resources by the herring gull Larus arqentatus.

== Career and research ==
Monaghan's research interests are in behavioural ecology, avian ecology, ornithology, molecular ecology and senescence. She has served as president of Association for the Study of Animal Behaviour (ASAB) since 2017.

=== Awards and honours ===
She delivered the Tinbergen Lecture for ASAB in 2006 and the Witherby Memorial Lecture for the British Trust for Ornithology (BTO) in 2004. In 2011 she was appointed a member of the Academia Europaea (MAE). Other awards and honours include:

- 1997: Elected a Fellow of the Royal Society of Edinburgh (FRSE)
- 2002: Corresponding Fellow of the American Ornithologists Union
- 2017: Awarded the Godman-Salvin Medal by the British Ornithologists' Union
- 2017: Awarded the Frink Medal by Zoological Society of London
- 2015: Awarded the ASAB Medal
- 2024: Elected a Fellow of the Royal Society (FRS)
