= Christine Nicol =

- Occupations: Author, academic and researcher
- Awards: Prince Laurent Foundation Prize; UFAW Award and Medal for Outstanding Achievement; EAAP A.M. Leroy Fellowship Award; British Veterinary Association (BVA) Wooldridge Memorial Medal

Academic background
- Education: B.A. (Hons); Ph.D. (D. Phil, Oxon)
- Alma mater: Somerville College, Oxford
- Thesis: Behavioural Needs of Battery Hens

Christine Nicol is an author, academic and a researcher. She is a Professor of Animal Welfare at the Royal Veterinary College and has honorary appointments at the University of Oxford and the University of Lincoln. She is the Field Chief Editor of Frontiers in Animal Science.

Nicol is the author of The Behavioural Biology of Chickens and has published over 200 research articles. Her research is focused primarily on the animal welfare science, including poultry production, cognitive abilities of domestic animals and the impact of humans on the welfare of wild animals.

Nicol's work has been internationally recognized. She was awarded Prince Laurent Foundation prize in 2001. She is the recipient of several awards such as UFAW Award and Medal for Outstanding Achievement, European Association for Animal Production A.M. Leroy Fellowship Award, ISAE 50th Anniversary Wood-Gush Memorial Award and British Veterinary Association Wooldridge Memorial Medal. Her work has contributed to EU ban on conventional battery cages for laying hens in 2012. She was recognized as an ASAB Tinbergen Lecturer in 2017.

== Education ==
Nicol completed her Bachelors in Zoology and her Ph.D. at Somerville College, Oxford in 1981 and 1986 respectively.

== Career ==
Nicol started her academic career in 1985 as a lecturer at University of Bristol. At the university, she was promoted to Reader in 1994 and then taught as a Professor of Animal Welfare from 2001 till 2017. During this time, she held visiting positions at Hamilton and McGill Universities and University of Waikato. In 2018, she was appointed as Professor at the Royal Veterinary College.

She was appointed as an Honorary Senior Research Associate at University of Oxford and as Honorary Visiting Professor at University of Lincoln in 2017. Apart from academic positions, Nicol also held research and administrative positions and Chaired the ASAB Education Committee from 1994 till 1996. She was appointed as Field Chief Editor at Frontiers in Animal Science in 2020.

Nicol wrote and presented a BBC radio series on animal ethics for a non-specialist audience.

=== Research and work ===
Nicol's research focuses on animal welfare science as the primary research area. She has conducted significant research on the methods used in this field. In her research about the need of hens to flap their wings in a cage environment, experiments in a controlled setting were conducted, differences between the control and experiment group were observed and the rebound rate was recorded during the experiment replication. This showed that hens did not adapt to living in a battery cage. She has also conducted investigations on how closely the commonly used welfare assessing measures are tied to animals’ preferences and environmental choices. She placed hens in three different environments and observed the environmental preferences for each animal. The findings provide a way of validating and justifying welfare indicators that can be used in practice.

Nicol has also researched on understanding the abnormal behavior in domestic animals. She authored an article observing the abnormal oral behavior in horses due to dietary changes. The horses were administered an antacid diet to control the crib-biting behavior of horses. The experiment indicated a decline in crib-biting behavior with the antacid diet. Nicol has conducted significant research on the role of ethics in animal welfare and scientific procedures. Her research suggests that the current limits on severity are not sufficient to protect animals. She authored an article presenting her stance against the use of live animals in experiments involving severe suffering such as exposure to events that threaten the biological or social functions of animals. She presents an ethical case in favor of imposing a ban on the use of animals in harmful experiments.

Along with advocating the regulatory ban on the involvement of animals in severely harmful experiments, Nicol also researched on the cognitive processes and animal sentience of domestic animals. She examined the cognitive influences on the avian maternal response in hens by manipulating chicks’ knowledge and observing the change in hen's response to chicks that appeared to be mildly distressed. It was found that hens experience emotional empathy and integrate their prior knowledge with the chick's distress cues and then exhibit an adaptive response. Nicol extended her research to study the impact of humans on wild animal populations. In early 2020s, she authored an article shedding light on the ‘Anthropogenic Threats to Wild Cetacean Welfare’ and also suggested the use of a welfare assessment tool for wild cetaceans for bridging information gaps present in policy making.

In 2015, Nicol authored a book called “The Behavioural Biology of Chickens” which was reviewed in 2016 by Paul M. Hocking. He states the book “covers a wide range of applied biology and behavior” and also refers to the book as an “excellent resource for more detailed research”.

== Awards and honors ==
- 2001 - Prince Laurent Foundation Prize for work on equine welfare
- 2003-2004 - Member, European Food Standards Authority (EFSA) Working Group
- 2006-2008 - Member, BBSRC Bioscience for Society Strategy Panel
- 2012 - UFAW Award and Medal for Outstanding Achievement in Animal Welfare Science
- 2016 - European Association for Animal Production (EAAP) A.M. Leroy Fellowship Award for outstanding scientific contribution
- 2016 - ISAE 50th Anniversary Wood-Gush Memorial Award
- 2016 - British Veterinary Association (BVA) Wooldridge Memorial Medal
- 2017 - ASAB Tinbergen Lecturer
- 2021 - Honorary Fellow: International Society for Applied Ethology

== Bibliography ==
=== Books ===
- The Behavioural Biology of Chickens (2015)
- Understanding the Behaviour and Improving the Welfare of Chickens (2020)

=== Selected articles ===
- McGreevy, P., Nicol, C.J., Cripps, P., Green, L & French, N. (1995) Management factors associated with stereotypic and redirected behaviour in the thoroughbred horse. Eq.Vet.J. 27: 86–91.
- Knowles, T.G., Kestin, S.C., Haslam, S.M., Brown, S.N., Green, L.E., Butterworth, A., Pope, S.J., Pfeiffer, D and Nicol, C.J. (2008) Leg disorders in broiler chickens: prevalence, risk factors and prevention. PLoS ONE 3(2): e1545. doi:10.1371/journal.pone.0001545
- Nicol, C.J. (1995) The social transmission of information and behaviour. Appl. Anim. Behav. Sci. 44: 79–98.
- Nicol, C.J., Gregory, N.G., Knowles, T., Parkman, I & Wilkins, L (1999) Differential effects of increased stocking density, mediated by increased flock size, on feather pecking and aggression in laying hens. Appl. Anim. Behav. Sci. 65: 137–152.
- Appleby, M.C., Walker, A.W., Nicol, C.J., Lindberg, A.C., Freire, R., Hughes, B.O. and Elson, H.A. (2002). Development of furnished cages for laying hens. Br. Poult. Sci. 43: 489-500
