= Frink Medal =

- Awarded for: “for significant and original contributions by a professional zoologist to the development of zoology.”
- Sponsored by: Zoological Society of London (ZSL)
- First award: 1973
- Website: www.zsl.org/about-us/zsl-awards

The Frink Medal for British Zoologists is awarded by the Zoological Society of London "for significant and original contributions by a professional zoologist to the development of zoology." (Note: The award for a particular year is presented to the recipient the following year. This can lead to discrepancies in some sources over the year of an award, with some reporting the year of presentation and some reporting the year stated on the award.) It consists of a bronze plaque (76 by 83 millimetres), depicting a bison and carved by British sculptor Elisabeth Frink. The Frink Medal was instituted in 1973 and first presented in 1974.

== Recipients ==
Source ZSL

- 2022 Jane Hurst
- 2021 Terry Burke
- 2020 Rosemary Grant
- 2019 Christl Donnelly
- 2018 John Macnamara
- 2017 Pat Monaghan
- 2016 Sarah Cleaveland
- 2015 Peter Holland
- 2014 Patrick Bateson (Note: This award was presented in June 2015.)
- 2013 Michael Edwin Akam
- 2012 Georgina Mary Mace
- 2011 Paul H. Harvey
- 2010 Ziheng Yang
- 2009 Charles Godfray (Note: The ZSL website states 2009; Who's Who states 2010.)
- 2008 Christopher Brian Stringer (Note: The ZSL website states 2008; Who's Who states 2009.)
- 2007 Thomas Cavalier-Smith (Note: The ZSL website states 2007; Who's Who states 2008.)
- 2006 Brian Charlesworth
- 2005 Geoffrey Alan Parker
- 2004 Malcolm Burrows (Note: The ZSL website states 2004; Who's Who states 2005.)
- 2003 Quentin Bone
- 2002 Michael Patrick Hassell
- 2001 Nicholas Barry Davies
- 2000 Richard Alan Fortey (Note: The ZSL website states 2000; Who's Who states 2001.)
- 1999 Linda Partridge (Note: The ZSL website states 1999; Who's Who states 2000.)
- 1998 John Hartley Lawton
- 1997 Timothy Hugh Clutton-Brock (Note: The ZSL website states 1997; Who's Who states 1998.)
- 1996 John Richard Krebs (Note: The ZSL website states 1996; Who's Who states 1997.)
- 1995 Robert McCredie May
- 1994 Michael Francis Land
- 1993 Roy Malcolm Anderson
- 1992 Brian Keith Follett (Note: The ZSL website states 1992; Who's Who states 1993.)
- 1991 Robert Aubrey Hinde (Note: The ZSL website states 1991; Who's Who states 1992.)
- 1990 William Donald Hamilton (Note: The ZSL website states 1990; Who's Who states 1991.)
- 1989 John Maynard Smith (Note: The ZSL website states 1989; other sources state 1990.)
- 1988 Arthur James Cain (Note: The ZSL website states 1988; other sources state 1990.)
- 1987 Eric James Denton
- 1986 Vera Fretter
- 1985 James Desmond Smyth (Note: The ZSL website states 1985; other sources state 1986.)
- 1984 Percy Cyril Claude Garnham (Note: The ZSL website states 1984; Who's Who states 1985.)
- 1983 Geoffrey Fryer
- 1982 James Munro Dodd
- 1981 James Eric Smith
- 1980 William Homan Thorpe
- 1979 Vero Copner Wynne-Edwards (Note: The ZSL website states 1979; other sources state 1980.)
- 1978 Vincent Wigglesworth (Note: The ZSL website states 1978; other sources state 1979.)
- 1977 Sidnie Milana Manton
- 1976 Ernest James William Barrington
- 1975 Alastair Graham (Note: The ZSL website states and the obituary from The Malacological Society of London state 1975; Who's Who states 1976.)
- 1974 John Zachary Young (Note: The ZSL website does not include this award in its listing as of March 2018, though it is mentioned in the Annual Report for 1975.)
- 1973 Julian Sorell Huxley (Note: The ZSL website does not include this award in its listing as of March 2018, though it is mentioned in the Annual Report for 1974.)

== See also ==
- List of biology awards
