= Vera Fretter =

British conchologist

Vera Fretter (5 July 1905 – 15 October 1992) was a British conchologist, and one of the authors (with Alastair Graham) of British Prosobranch Molluscs (1962, revised edition 1994).

Fretter was brought up in Plumstead, London. She trained as a teacher at Furzedown Training College, and taught at a primary school in south-east London. While teaching she studied in the evenings at Birkbeck, University of London, obtaining a first class B.Sc. in zoology. She then took up full-time studies and gained her doctorate in 1936. She worked at the University of Reading from 1954 until her retirement in 1970.

Fretter specialised in the study of prosobranch molluscs. She was awarded the 1986 Frink Medal from the Zoological Society of London: "for her contributions to the understanding of the developmental biology, physiological ecology and functional morphology of the prosobranch molluscs". British Prosobranch Molluscs was originally published in 1962 by The Ray Society, and republished in a revised and updated edition in 1994.

Fretter was President of the Malacological Society of London from 1966 to 1969. She joined the Conchological Society of Great Britain & Ireland in 1966, and remained active in research at the University of Reading until her death. In her will, she left £200,000 to the Royal Society for use in marine biological research.

In 2001, Fretter and Ruth Turner were honoured by the symposium 'New Frontiers in Functional Morphology of Molluscs', held at the second World Congress of Malacology in Vienna, Austria, in August of that year.
