= Felicity Huntingford =

British ecologist

Felicity Anne Huntingford FRSE (born 17 June 1948) is an aquatic ecologist known for her work in fish behaviour.

== Career ==
Huntingford's research interests include the aggression in sticklebacks and the welfare of farmed fish.

She is the author and editor of several widely cited and reviewed books, including the textbook The Study of Animal Behaviour.

Huntingford has served as president of the Fisheries Society of the British Isles, the Association for the Study of Animal Behaviour, and the World Council of Fisheries Societies. She is Emeritus Professor of Functional Ecology at the University of Glasgow.

== Awards and honours ==
Huntingford was elected to the Royal Society of Edinburgh in 1996 in the discipline of organismal and environmental biology.

Huntingford has presented as an invited lecturer in several named lecture series. Huntingford was awarded the 2001 Tinbergen Lecture by the Association for the Study of Animal Behaviour. She also delivered the 2012 Fisheries Society of the British Isles (FSBI) Jack Jones Lecture.

Huntingford has been honoured with several major academic awards, including the 2006 ASAB Medal and the 2013 FSBI Beverton Medal.

She was awarded an Honorary Doctorate from the Swedish University of Agricultural Sciences in 2009.

== Selected published works ==
Huntingford, F.A. (1976). "The relationship between anti-predator behaviour and aggression among conspecifics in the three-spined stickleback, Gasterosteus Aculeatus". Animal Behaviour. 24 (2): 245–260. doi:10.1016/S0003-3472(76)80034-6. S2CID 53194777.

Huntingford, Felicity (1984). The Study of Animal Behaviour. Chapman and Hall. ISBN 978-0412223204.

Huntingford, F.; Turner, A. (1987). Animal Conflict. Chapman and Hall. ISBN 9789401090087.

Thorpe, J.E.; Mangel, M.; Metcalfe, N.B.; Huntingford, F.A. (1998). "Modelling the proximate basis of salmonid life-history variation, with application to Atlantic salmon, Salmo salar L.". Evolutionary Ecology. 12 (5): 581–599. Bibcode:1998EvEco..12..581T. doi:10.1023/a:1022351814644. S2CID 36023623.

Huntingford, F.A. (2004). "Implications of domestication and rearing conditions for the behaviour of cultivated fishes". Journal of Fish Biology. 65 (s1): 122–142. Bibcode:2004JFBio..65S.122H. doi:10.1111/j.0022-1112.2004.00562.x.

Huntingford, F.A.; Adams, C.; Braithwaite, V.A.; Kadri, S.; Pottinger, T.G.; Sandøe, P.; Turnbull, J.F. (2006). "Current issues in fish welfare" (PDF). Journal of Fish Biology. 68 (2): 332–372. Bibcode:2006JFBio..68..332H. doi:10.1111/j.0022-1112.2006.001046.x.

Östlund-Nilsson, S.; Mayer, I.; Huntingford, F., eds. (2006). Biology of the three-spined stickleback. CRC Press. ISBN 9780849332197.
