= Alastair Graham =

Scottish zoologist and academic

- Born: 6 November 1906; Corstorphine, Edinburgh, Scotland
- Died: 12 December 2000 (aged 94); Reading, England
- Education: University of Edinburgh
- Known for: prosobranch gastropods
- Awards: Keith Medal (1949-51); Linnean Gold Medal (1968); Frink Medal (1975)
- Scientific career
- Fields: Malacology
- Notable students: Vera Fretter

Alastair Graham, FRS (6 November 1906 – 12 December 2000) was a Scottish zoologist and academic who specialised in malacology.

== Biography ==
He was born in Costorphine, Edinburgh, and schooled at the Royal High School, Edinburgh, leaving in 1924 as Dux of School. He studied at the University of Edinburgh, graduating with an MA in 1927, he continued then transferred to study zoology graduating with a BSc in 1929. After a short period of research at the university, he was appointed a lecturer at the University of Sheffield where he developed his lifelong interest in prosobranch gastropods. After four years in Sheffield he was appointed to a Readership at Birkbeck College, London, becoming Head of Department in 1943 and Professor in 1947.

In 1952 he accepted the Chair of Zoology at the University of Reading, where he co-authored a classic monograph, British prosobranch molluscs, with Dr Vera Fretter, which was published in 1962. He became Dean of the Faculty and Deputy Vice-Chancellor, the latter for two terms, before his retirement in 1972.

He served as president of the Malacological Society of London from 1954 to 1957, and as Editor of their Proceedings from 1969 to 1985.

== Honours and awards ==
Graham was awarded a DSc (London) in 1944, the Keith Medal of the Royal Society of Edinburgh in 1951, the Gold Medal of the Linnean Society of London in 1968, and the Frink Medal of the Zoological Society of London in 1975. He was elected a Fellow of the Royal Society in 1979.

== Family life ==
He had married twice; firstly Gwynneth Hayes, with whom he has two sons and secondly, after her death, Elizabeth Andrews. He died in Berkshire in 2000.
