= James Eric Smith =

British zoologist

Sir James Eric Smith, CBE, FRS (23 February 1909 – 3 September 1990) was a British zoologist.

He was educated at Hull Grammar School and King's College London where he read zoology. He was Professor of Zoology at Queen Mary University of London from 1950 to 1965. He was awarded the Linnean Gold Medal in 1971. He was awarded the Frink Medal of the Zoological Society of London in 1981. He was elected a Fellow of the Royal Society in 1958. He was made a CBE in 1972 and knighted in 1977.
