= Ernest Barrington =

Ernest James William Barrington (1909–1985) was a British professor of zoology and one of the founders of comparative endocrinology.

== Early life and education ==
Barrington was born in Putney, London, on 17 February 1909. Educated at Christ's Hospital school in Horsham, Barrington was a talented musician and while still at school gained qualifications as an organist include ARCO (Associate of the Royal College of Organists) and LRAM (Licentiate of the Royal Academy of Music). He started his university studies at Oriel College, Oxford, as an organ scholar. While at Oxford he studied both music and zoology, but did not complete his music degree (he graduated B.A. in zoology in 1931). He studied under the zoologists Edwin Stephen Goodrich and Gavin de Beer, and obtained his B.Sc. in 1934 while carrying out research with the latter.

== Career ==
Barrington's major contributions were as a teacher and author of texts on endocrinology. He was appointed lecturer in zoology at University College, Nottingham (later the University of Nottingham), in 1932. He became head of the department in 1934 (still aged only 25). Barrington attained the status of Reader in 1945, and was awarded his D.Sc. in 1947. He was made Professor of Zoology (a new chair) in 1949 and held that office for 25 years until 1974, followed by the status of emeritus Professor. Barrington was also Deputy Vice Chancellor at Nottingham from 1956 to 1959, and a Public Orator at the university from 1964 to 1970.

== Honours and awards ==
Barrington was elected Fellow of the Royal Society (FRS) in 1967. He was awarded an honorary D.Sc. by the University of Nottingham in 1975. He was awarded the Frink Medal of the Zoological Society of London in 1976. This award was for his services to the Zoological Society on whose council and committees he had served for many years. The Barrington-Kobayashi Lecture of the International Federation of Comparative Endocrine Societies (IFCES) was jointly named in his honour.

== Personal life ==
Barrington married Muriel Catherine Anne Clinton in 1943, and they had two children Heather and John. He and his wife (Anne) retired to Alderton, Gloucestershire where he was organist and choirmaster at the local parish church. Barrington died aged 76 on 15 December 1985.

== Works ==
- An Introduction to General and Comparative Endocrinology (1963, second edition 1975)
- The Biology of Hemichordata and Protochordata (1965)
- The Chemical Basis of Physiological Regulation (1968)
- Hormones and Evolution (1964)
- Invertebrate Structure and Function (1967)
- Environmental Biology (1980)
