= Nicholas B. Davies (scientist) =

British zoologist and professor

Nick Davies FRS
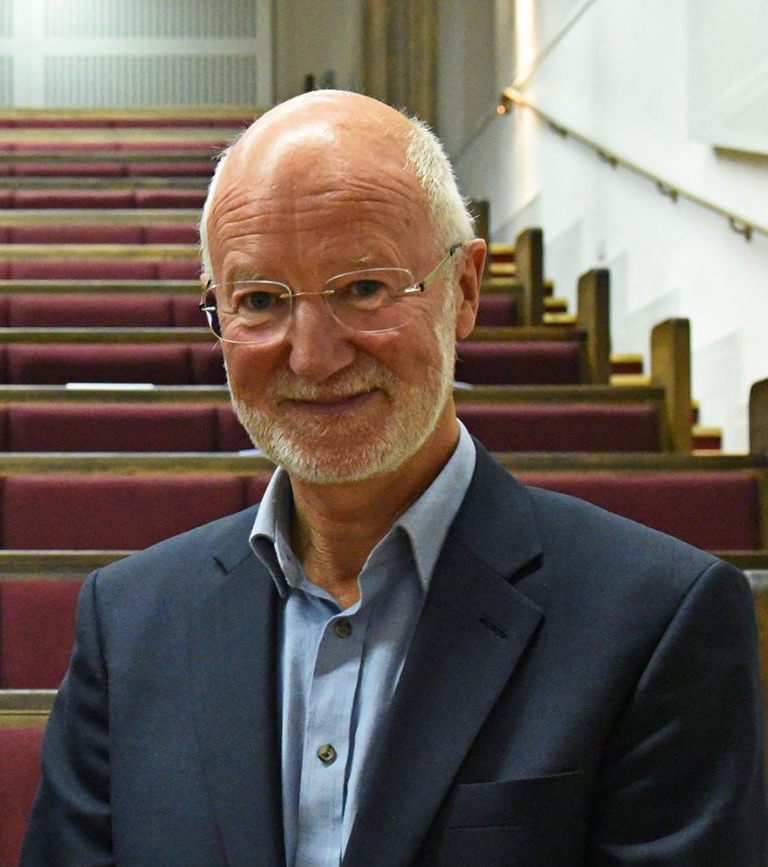
- Nick Davies in 2019
- Born: Nicholas Barry Davies; May 23, 1952 (age 74)
- Citizenship: British
- Education: Merchant Taylors' Boys' School, Crosby, University of Cambridge (BA, MA); University of Oxford (DPhil)
- Spouse: Jan Parr (m. 1979)
- Children: Two
- Awards: ASAB Medal (1996); Frink Medal (2001); Croonian Medal (2015)
- Scientific career
- Fields: Zoology; Behavioral ecology
- Thesis: The feeding behaviour of some insectivorous birds (1976)
- Doctoral advisor: Euan Dunn
- Website: www.zoo.cam.ac.uk/directory/nick-davies

Nicholas Barry Davies FRS (born 1952) is a British field naturalist and zoologist, and Emeritus Professor of Behavioural ecology at the University of Cambridge, where he is also an Emeritus Fellow of Pembroke College, Cambridge.

== Education ==
Davies was privately educated at the Merchant Taylors' Boys' School, Crosby and the University of Cambridge where he was a student at Pembroke College, Cambridge. He was awarded a Bachelor of Arts (BA) degree in 1973, which was automatically converted into a Master of Arts (MA) degree in 1977. He completed his PhD at the University of Oxford in 1976 supervised by Euan Dunn.

== Career and research ==
Davies books with John Krebs helped to define the field of behavioural ecology, the study of how behaviour evolves in response to selection pressures from ecology and the social environment.

Davies study of dunnocks, linked detailed behavioural observations of individuals to their reproductive success, using DNA profiles to measure paternity and maternity, and revealed how sexual conflicts gave rise to variable mating systems including: monogamy, polygyny in animals, polyandry in animals and polygynandry.

Davies studies of cuckoos and their hosts have revealed an evolutionary arms race of brood parasite adaptations and host counter-adaptations.

Other studies include: territory economics in pied wagtails; contest behaviour and mate searching in butterflies and toads; parent-offspring conflict and the transition to independence in young birds.

=== Awards and honours ===
- Scientific Medal of the Zoological Society of London, 1987
- Elected a Fellow of the Royal Society (FRS) in 1994
- University of Cambridge Teaching Prize, 1995
- William Bate Hardy Prize of the Cambridge Philosophical Society, 1995
- Medal of the Association for the Study of Animal Behaviour, 1996
- President of the International Society for Behavioural Ecology, 2000-2002
- British Trust for Ornithology / British Birds "Best Book of the Year Award" in 2000 (for Cuckoos, Cowbirds and Other Cheats) and in 2015 (for Cuckoo - Cheating by Nature).
- Frink Medal of the Zoological Society of London, 2001
- Elliott Coues Medal of the American Ornithologists' Union, 2005
- Hamilton Prize Lecture of the International Society for Behavioural Ecology, 2010
- Croonian Medal and Lecture of the Royal Society, 2015
- Godman Salvin Medal of the British Ornithologists' Union, 2022

=== Publications ===
- Behavioural Ecology - An Evolutionary Approach
- An Introduction to Behavioural Ecology
- Dunnock Behaviour and Social Evolution
- Cuckoos, Cowbirds and Other Cheats

=== Media coverage ===
In 2009, his research was featured as a BBC Natural World program "Cuckoo", produced by Mike Birkhead and narrated by David Attenborough.

In 2011 he presented a BBC Radio 4 documentary entitled 'The Cuckoo'.

In 2016 he was interviewed by Jim Al-Khalili for The Life Scientific.

In 2017 he was the guest of Michael Berkeley on the BBC Radio 3 show Private Passions.

In 2017 he appeared in an episode of the BBC Radio 4 Natural Histories series entitled "Cuckoo".

== Personal life ==
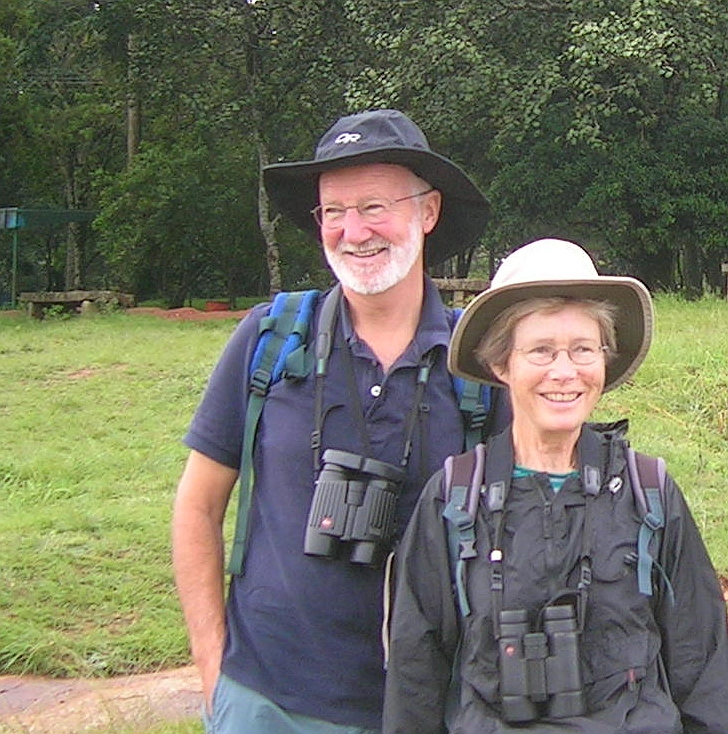
Davies with his wife Jan, in the Nandi Hills, India

Davies married Jan Parr in 1976 and has two children.

His entry in Who's Who lists his hobbies as cricket and birdwatching.
