= Prince Laurent Foundation =

Belgian nonprofit organization

The Prince Laurent Foundation is a Belgian non-profit organization for the welfare of domestic and wild animals. It was founded in 1996, under the presidency of Prince Laurent of Belgium.

== Activities ==
The activities of the foundation focus on four areas:

1. Veterinary dispensaries
2. Belgian platform for alternative methods to animal experimentation
3. Equine Research & Welfare Fund
4. Scientific prizes and awards

== See also ==
- Animal welfare
- KINT-IRGT
- King Baudouin Foundation

== Sources ==
- Prince Laurent Foundation
