= Geoffrey Matthews =

British ornithologist (1923–2013)

- Born: 16 June 1923
- Died: 21 January 2013 (aged 89)
- Occupation(s): British ornithologist and conservationist

Geoffrey Vernon Townsend Matthews OBE FSB (16 June 1923 – 21 January 2013) was a British ornithologist and conservationist.

== Biography ==
Born on 16 June 1923 and educated at Bedford School and at Christ's College, Cambridge, where he completed his doctorate and post-doctoral research, Geoffrey Matthews was director of research and conservation, 1955–1988, and deputy director, 1973–1988, at the Wildfowl & Wetlands Trust, Slimbridge. He was also a professorial fellow at Bristol University between 1970 and 1990.

Matthews died on 21 January 2013.

== Publications ==
- Matthews, G. V. T. (1955). Bird navigation. Cambridge: Cambridge University Press.
- Matthews, G. V. T. (1968). Bird navigation. Cambridge: Cambridge University Press.
- Matthews, G. V. T. (1971). Vogelflug. München: Goldmann.
- Matthews, G. V. T. (1973). Orientation and Position-finding by Birds. Oxford: Oxford University Press. ISBN 978-0199141364.
