= Innes Cuthill =

Professor of behavioural ecology

Innes C. Cuthill (born 1960) is a professor of behavioural ecology at the University of Bristol. His main research interest is in camouflage, in particular how it evolves in response to the colour vision of other animals such as predators.

== Life ==
Cuthill was educated at University College School, London. He gained a First in natural sciences (zoology) at the University of Cambridge, graduating in 1982 and gained his D.Phil. at the University of Oxford in 1985. He was a junior research fellow at Brasenose College, Oxford until 1989 when he became a lecturer at the University of Bristol. He became a professor there in 1998 and was head of the School of Biological Sciences from 2008 to 2012.

== Work ==
Cuthill describes himself as "wear[ing] two hats, behavioural ecologist and sensory ecologist", unified by seeking to explain the "design, through natural selection, of animal form and function." He states that his main research interest is the evolution of camouflage of one kind of animal, such as prey, in response to the colour vision of another kind of animal, such as a predator.

He has published over 250 research papers, mainly on vision and camouflage, though he has also written on the use of statistics in biology, cited over 2700 times, and was co-author of the ARRIVE and ARRIVE2 guidelines for reporting the use of animals in research, cited over 10,000 times.

== Awards and distinctions ==
Cuthill won the Scientific Medal of the Zoological Society of London in 1998, the Nature and NESTA award for mentoring in science in 2005. From 2007 to 2010 he was president of the Association for the Study of Animal Behaviour. He gave the Tinbergen Lecture of 2014 and won the 2018 ASAB medal for contributions to the science of animal behaviour. He was a Fellow of the Wissenschaftskolleg zu Berlin (Institute of Advanced Studies) from 2015-16. Nakagawa & Cuthill (2007) was selected by Biological Reviews as one of their highlight papers of the last 200 years
