= Chris Barnard (footballer) =

Welsh footballer (1947–2025)

Personal information
- Full name: Christopher Leslie Barnard
- Date of birth: 1 August 1947
- Place of birth: Cardiff, Wales
- Date of death: 13 January 2025 (aged 77)
- Height: 5 ft 8 in (1.73 m)
- Position: Midfielder

Youth career
- –1965: Southend United

Senior career*
Years	Team	Apps	(Gls)
1965–1966	Southend United	8	(0)
1966–1970	Ipswich Town	21	(0)
1970–1972	Torquay United	32	(3)
1972	Charlton Athletic	1	(0)
1972–1973	Chelmsford City		
1973–1974	Cambridge City		
- Chelmsford City

International career
- Wales U23
- * Club domestic league appearances and goals as of 18:40, 5 August 2017 (UTC)

Christopher Leslie Barnard (1 August 1947 – 13 January 2025) was a Welsh professional footballer in the 1960s and 1970s.

== Club career ==
Chris Barnard, a midfielder, began his career as an apprentice at Southend United, turning professional in August 1965 and playing eight times in the league the following season (four as substitute). In July 1966 he moved to Ipswich Town on a free transfer, but failed to win a regular place at Portman Road, appearing only 21 times in the league in four years. In October 1970, Torquay United paid £8,000 for his services, some of which was repaid in January 1971 when he scored twice as the Gulls came from 3–0 down to beat Lincoln City 4–3 in the FA Cup. In January 1972, after 32 league games and scoring three goals for the Gulls, he moved to Charlton Athletic on a free transfer, but made only one substitute appearance before leaving.

In March 1972, Barnard dropped into non-league football, signing for Chelmsford City, playing the final few games of Chelmsford's victorious 1971–72 Southern League campaign. Following the end of the 1972–73 season, Barnard signed for Southern League rivals Cambridge City. In the summer of 1974, following a successful trial, Barnard was re-signed by Chelmsford City by new manager Sid Prosser.

== International career ==
During his early career, Barnard represented Wales' under-23 team.

== Personal life and death ==
Barnard was born in Cardiff, Wales on 1 August 1947. He died after a short illness on 13 January 2025, at the age of 77.
