= Christopher J. Barnard =

British evolutionary biologist

Christopher John Barnard (2 September 1952 – 1 June 2007) was a British evolutionary biologist, Professor of Animal Behaviour at the University of Nottingham from 1996 until his death.
