= Behavioral ecology =

Study of the evolutionary basis for animal behavior due to ecological pressures

Some examples of behavioural ecology

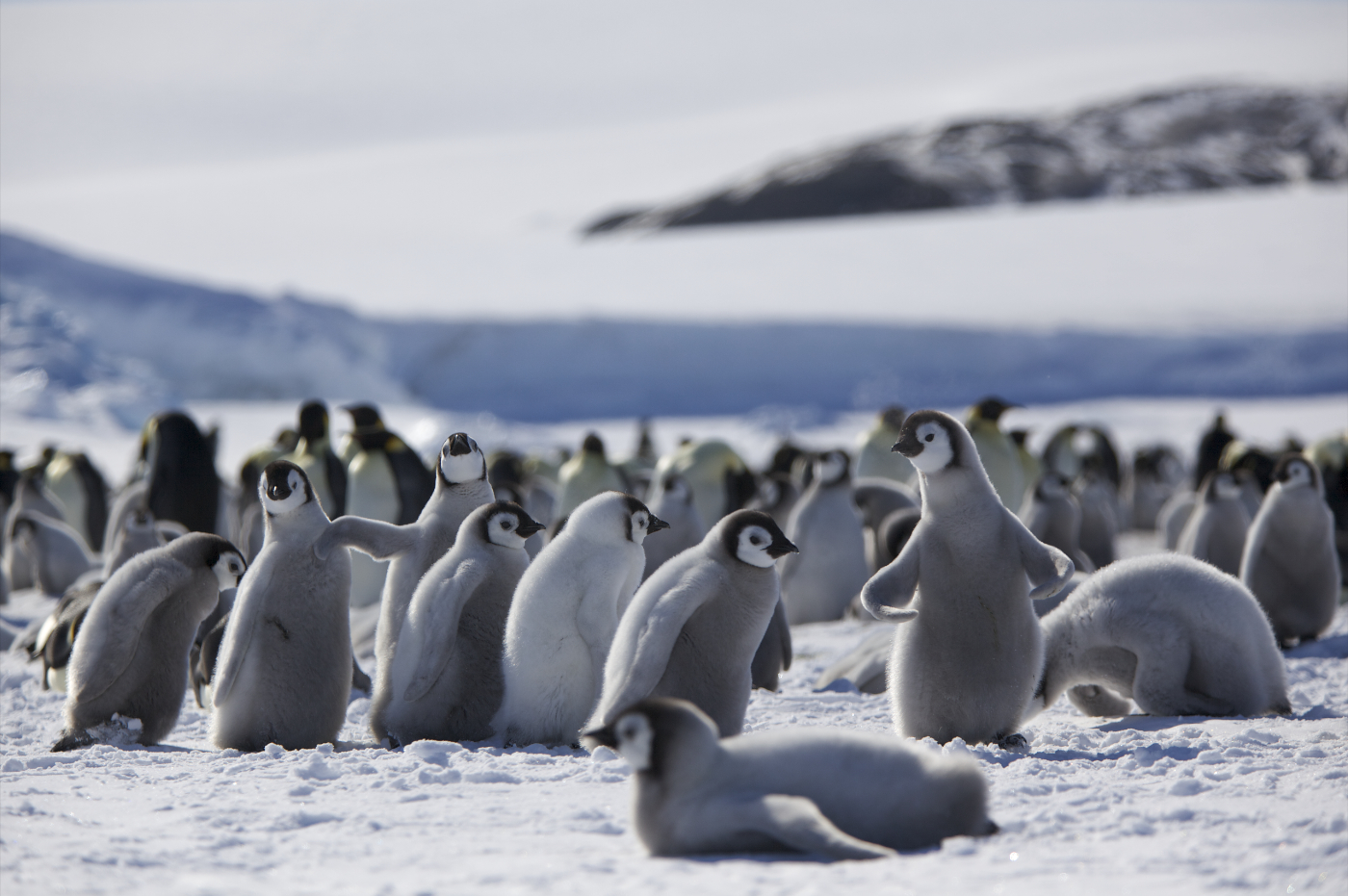
Penguins huddling in the Antarctic

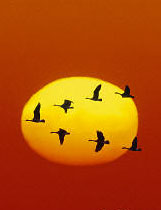
Geese flying in aerodynamic V-formation

The bee waggle dance communicating information

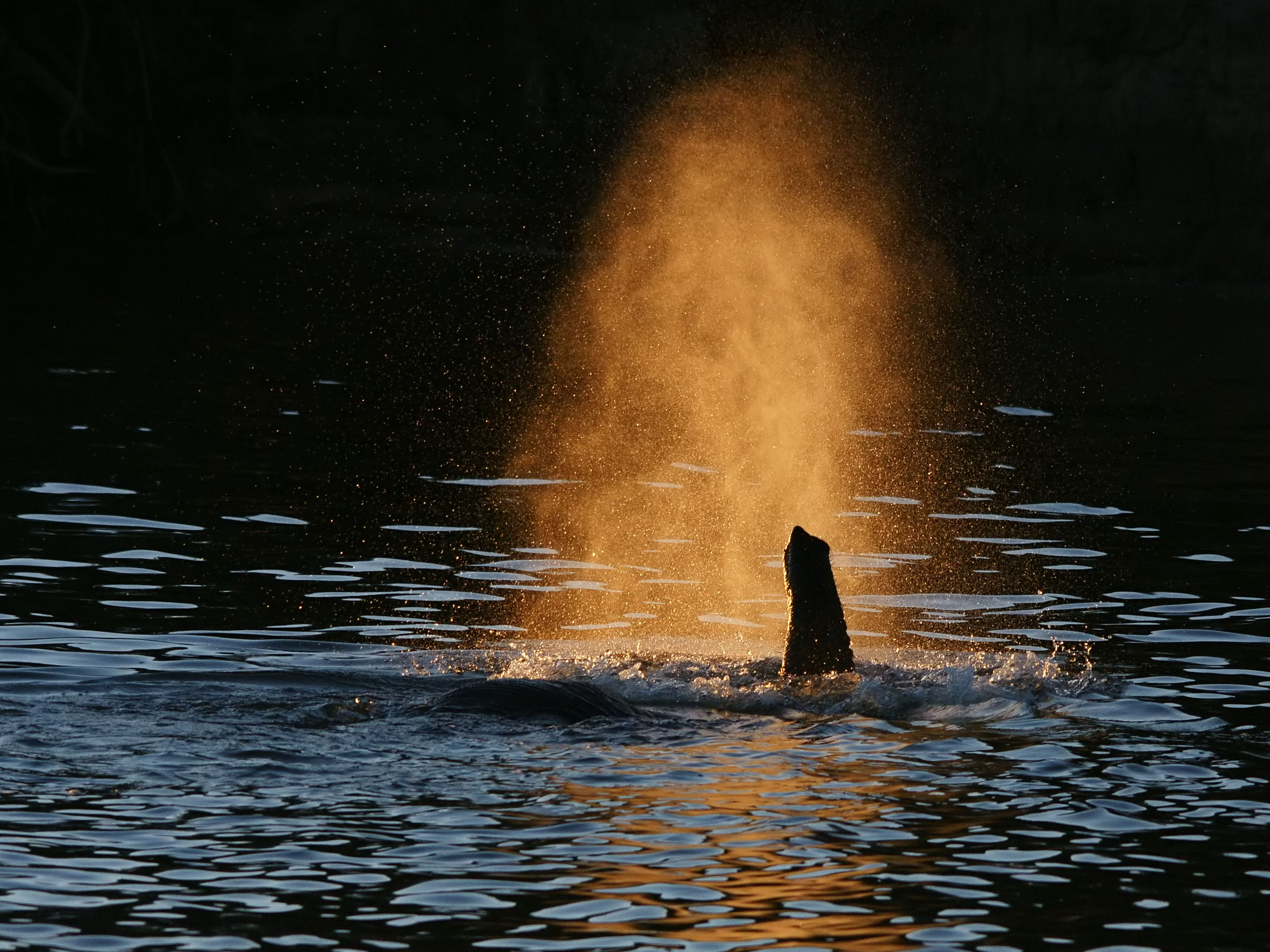
An African elephant crossing a river

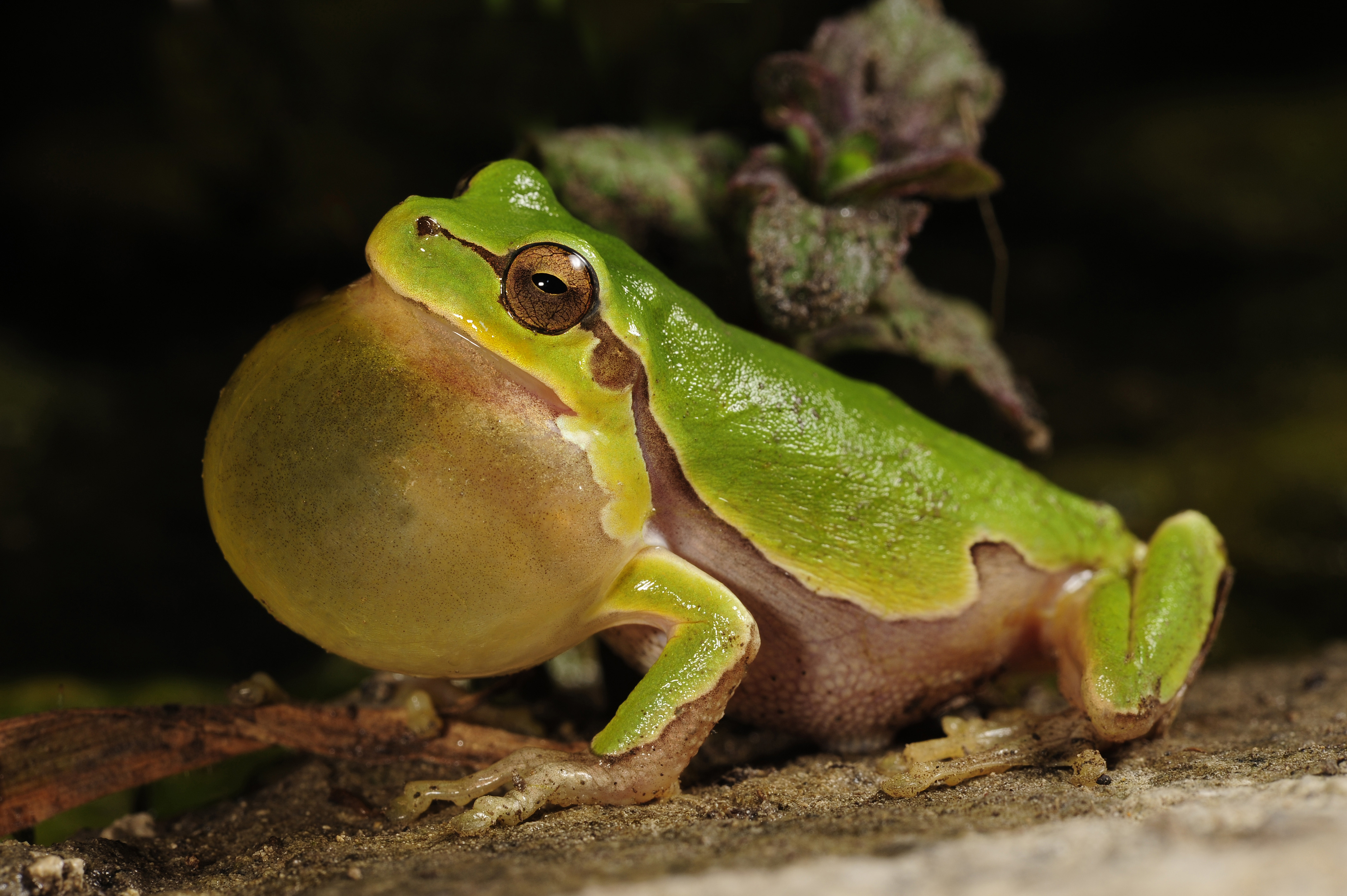
A frog with inflated vocal sac

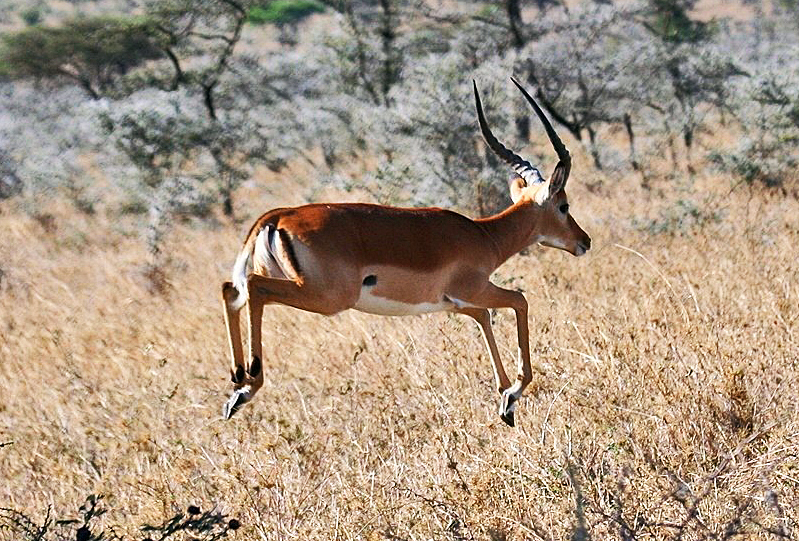
A stotting gazelle

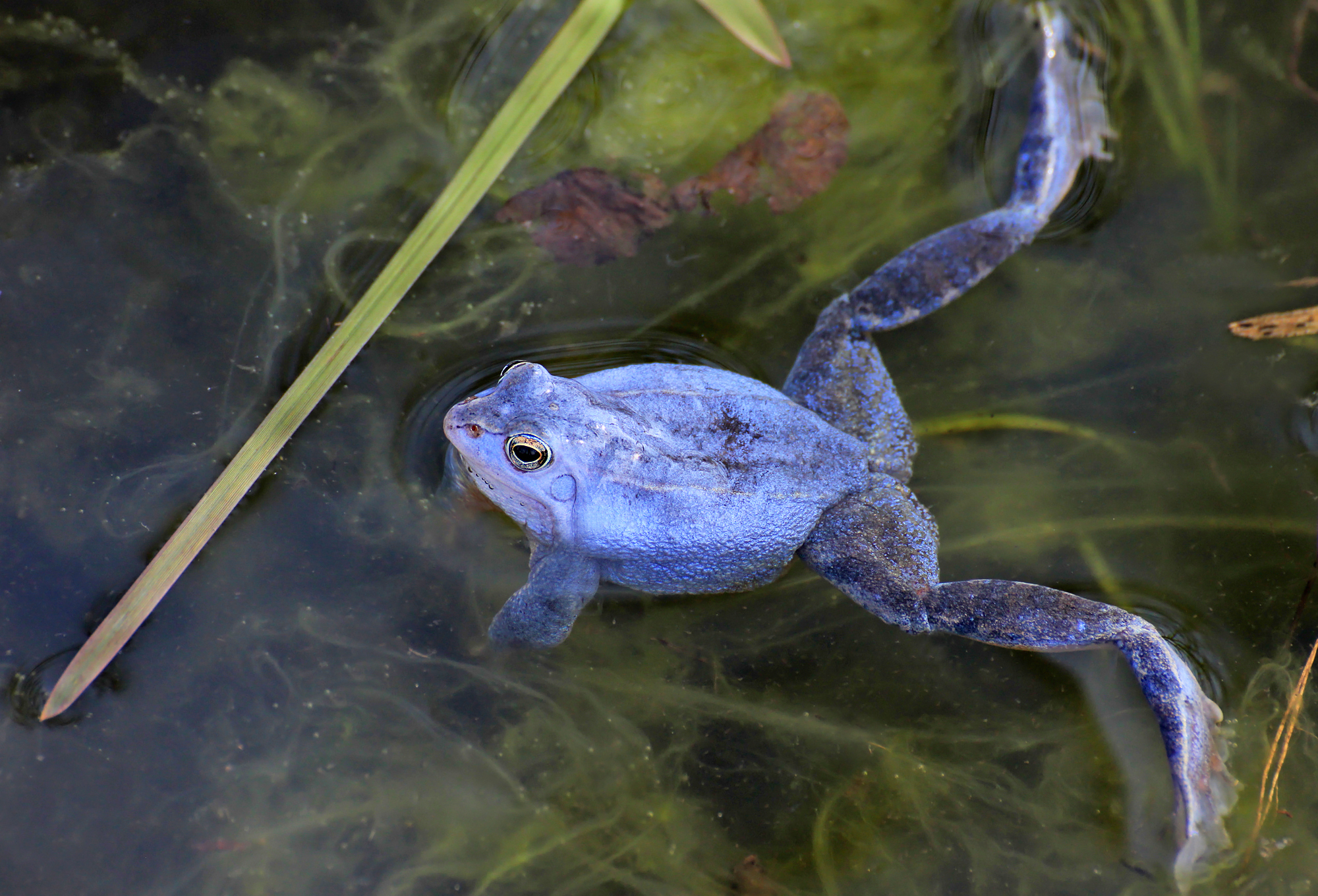
A male moor frog colored blue

Behavioral ecology, also spelled behavioural ecology, is the study of the evolutionary basis for animal behavior due to ecological pressures. Behavioral ecology emerged from ethology after Niko Tinbergen outlined four questions to address when studying animal behaviors: what are the proximate causes, ontogeny, survival value, and phylogeny of a behavior?

If an organism has a trait that provides a selective advantage (i.e., has adaptive significance) in its environment, then natural selection favors it. Adaptive significance refers to the expression of a trait that affects fitness, measured by an individual's reproductive success. Adaptive traits are those that produce more copies of the individual's genes in future generations. Maladaptive traits are those that leave fewer. For example, if a bird that can call more loudly attracts more mates, then a loud call is an adaptive trait for that species because a louder bird mates more frequently than less loud birds—thus sending more loud-calling genes into future generations. Conversely, loud calling birds may attract the attention of predators more often, decreasing their presence in the gene pool.

Individuals are always in competition with others for limited resources, including food, territories, and mates. Conflict occurs between predators and prey, between rivals for mates, between siblings, mates, and even between parents and offspring.

== Competing for resources ==
The value of a social behavior depends in part on the social behavior of an animal's neighbors. For example, the more likely a rival male is to back down from a threat, the more value a male gets out of making the threat. The more likely, however, that a rival will attack if threatened, the less useful it is to threaten other males. When a population exhibits a number of interacting social behaviors such as this, it can evolve a stable pattern of behaviors known as an evolutionarily stable strategy (or ESS). This term, derived from economic game theory, became prominent after John Maynard Smith (1982) recognized the possible application of the concept of a Nash equilibrium to model the evolution of behavioral strategies.

=== Evolutionarily stable strategy ===
In short, evolutionary game theory asserts that only strategies that, when common in the population, cannot be "invaded" by any alternative (mutant) strategy are evolutionarily stable strategies, and thus maintained in the population. In other words, at equilibrium every player should play the best strategic response to each other. When the game is two-player and symmetric, each player should play the strategy that provides the best response.

Therefore, the ESS is considered the evolutionary end point subsequent to the interactions. As the fitness conveyed by a strategy is influenced by what other individuals are doing (the relative frequency of each strategy in the population), behavior can be governed not only by optimality but the frequencies of strategies adopted by others and are therefore frequency dependent (frequency dependence).

Behavioral evolution is therefore influenced by both the physical environment and interactions between other individuals.

Evolutionary models also indicate that learning is favored when environmental conditions change at intermediate levels of predictability, and recent syntheses have emphasized the need for consistent definitions of ecological change to better link theoretical predictions with empirical systems.

An example of how changes in geography can make a strategy susceptible to alternative strategies is the parasitization of the African honey bee, A. m. scutellata.

=== Resource defense ===
The term economic defendability was first introduced by Jerram Brown in 1964. Economic defensibility holds that defending a resource entails costs, such as energy expenditure or risk of injury, as well as benefits, such as priority access to the resource. Territorial behavior arises when benefits are greater than the costs.

Studies of the golden-winged sunbird have validated the concept of economic defendability. Comparing the energetic costs a sunbird expends in a day to the extra nectar gained by defending a territory, researchers showed that birds only became territorial when they were making a net energetic profit. When resources are at low density, the gains from excluding others may not be sufficient to pay for the cost of territorial defense. In contrast, when resource availability is high, there may be so many intruders that the defender would have no time to make use of the resources made available by defense.

Sometimes the economics of resource competition favor shared defense. An example is the feeding territories of the white wagtail. The white wagtails feed on insects washed up by the river onto the bank, which acts as a renewing food supply. If any intruders harvested their territory, then the prey would quickly become depleted, but sometimes territory owners tolerate a second bird, known as a satellite. The two sharers would then move out of phase with one another, resulting in decreased feeding rate but also increased defense, illustrating advantages of group living.

=== Ideal free distribution ===
One of the major models used to predict the distribution of competing individuals amongst resource patches is the ideal free distribution model. Within this model, resource patches can vary in quality, and there is no limit to the number of individuals that can occupy and extract resources from a particular patch. Competition within a particular patch means that the benefit each individual receives from exploiting a patch decreases logarithmically with the increasing number of competitors sharing that resource patch. The model predicts that individuals will initially flock to higher-quality patches until the costs of crowding bring the benefits of exploiting them into line with the benefits of being the only individual on a lesser-quality resource patch. After this point is reached, individuals will alternate between exploiting higher- and lower-quality patches so that the average benefit for all individuals in both patches is the same. This model is ideal in that individuals have complete information about the quality of a resource patch and the number of individuals currently exploiting it, and free in that individuals are freely able to choose which resource patch to exploit.

An experiment by Manfred Malinski in 1979 demonstrated that feeding behavior in three-spined sticklebacks follows an ideal free distribution. Six fish were placed in a tank, and food items were dropped into opposite ends of the tank at different rates. The rate of food deposition at one end was set to twice that of the other end, and the fish distributed themselves with four individuals at the faster-depositing end and two individuals at the slower-depositing end. In this way, the average feeding rate was the same for all of the fish in the tank.

=== Mating strategies and tactics ===
As with any competition for resources, species across the animal kingdom may also engage in competitions for mating. If one considers mates or potential mates as a resource, these sexual partners can be randomly distributed amongst resource pools within a given environment. Following the ideal free distribution model, suitors distribute themselves amongst the potential mates in an effort to maximize their chances or the number of potential matings. For all competitors, males of a species, in most cases, there are variations in both the strategies and tactics used to obtain matings. Strategies generally refer to the genetically determined behaviors that can be described as conditional. Tactics refer to the subset of behaviors within a given genetic strategy. Thus it is not difficult for a great many variations in mating strategies to exist in a given environment or species.

An experiment conducted by Anthony Arak, where playback of synthetic calls from male natterjack toads was used to manipulate the behavior of the males in a chorus, the difference between strategies and tactics is clear. While small and immature, male natterjack toads adopted a satellite tactic to parasitize larger males. Though large males on average still retained greater reproductive success, smaller males were able to intercept matings. When the large males of the chorus were removed, smaller males adopted a calling behavior, no longer competing against the loud calls of larger males. When smaller males got larger, and their calls more competitive, then they started calling and competing directly for mates.

== Sexual selection ==
=== Mate choice by resources ===
In many sexually reproducing species, such as mammals, birds, and amphibians, females are able to bear offspring for a certain time period, during which the males are free to mate with other available females, and therefore can father many more offspring to pass on their genes. The fundamental difference between male and female reproduction mechanisms determines the different strategies each sex employs to maximize their reproductive success. For males, reproductive success is limited by access to females, while for females, it is limited by access to resources. In this sense, females can be much choosier than males because they have to bet on the resources provided by the males to ensure reproductive success.

Resources usually include nest sites, food and protection. In some cases, the males provide all of them (e.g., sedge warblers). The females dwell in their chosen males' territories for access to these resources. The males gain ownership to the territories through male–male competition that often involves physical aggression. Only the largest and strongest males manage to defend the best quality nest sites. Females choose males by inspecting the quality of different territories or by assessing male traits that indicate resource quality. One example of this is with the grayling butterfly (Hipparchia semele), where males engage in complex flight patterns to decide who defends a particular territory. The female grayling butterfly chooses a male based on the most optimal location for oviposition. Sometimes, males leave after mating. The only resource that a male provides is a nuptial gift, such as protection or food, as seen in Drosophila subobscura. The female can evaluate the quality of the protection or food provided by the male so as to decide whether to mate or not or how long she is willing to copulate.

=== Mate choice by genes ===
When males' only contribution to offspring is their sperm, females are particularly choosy. With this high level of female choice, sexual ornaments are seen in males, where the ornaments reflect the male's social status. Two hypotheses have been proposed to conceptualize the genetic benefits from female mate choice.

First, the good genes hypothesis suggests that female choice is for higher genetic quality and that this preference is favored because it increases fitness of the offspring. This includes Zahavi's handicap hypothesis and Hamilton and Zuk's host and parasite arms race. Zahavi's handicap hypothesis was proposed within the context of looking at elaborate male sexual displays. He suggested that females favor ornamented traits because they are handicaps and indicators of the male's genetic quality. Since these ornamented traits are hazards, the male's survival must indicate his high genetic quality in other areas. In this way, the degree to which a male expresses his sexual display indicates to the female his genetic quality. Zuk and Hamilton proposed a hypothesis after observing disease as a powerful selective pressure on a rabbit population. They suggested that sexual displays were indicators of resistance to disease on a genetic level.

Such 'choosiness' from the female individuals can be seen in wasp species too, especially among Polistes dominula wasps. Females tend to prefer males with smaller, more elliptically shaped spots than those with larger and more irregularly shaped spots. Those males would have reproductive superiority over males with irregular spots.

In marbled newts, females show a preference for mates with larger crests. This, however, is not considered a handicap as it does not negatively affect males' chances of survival. It is simply a trait females prefer when choosing their mate, as it indicates health and fitness.

Fisher's hypothesis of runaway sexual selection suggests that female preference is genetically correlated with male traits and that the preference co-evolves with the evolution of that trait, thus the preference is under indirect selection. Fisher suggests that female preference began because the trait indicated the male's quality. The female preference spread, so that the females' offspring benefited from the higher quality of a specific trait but also greater attractiveness to mates. Eventually, the trait only represents attractiveness to mates, and no longer represents increased survival.

An example of mate choice by genes is seen in the cichlid fish Tropheus moorii where males provide no parental care. An experiment found that a female T. moorii is more likely to choose a mate with the same color morph as her own. In another experiment, females have been shown to share preferences for the same males when given two to choose from, meaning some males get to reproduce more often than others.

=== Sensory bias ===
The sensory bias hypothesis states that the preference for a trait evolves in a non-mating context, and is then exploited by one sex to obtain more mating opportunities. The competitive sex evolves traits that exploit a pre-existing bias that the choosy sex already possesses. This mechanism is thought to explain remarkable trait differences in closely related species by producing a divergence in signaling systems, which leads to reproductive isolation.

Sensory bias has been demonstrated in guppies, freshwater fish from Trinidad and Tobago. In this mating system, female guppies prefer to mate with males with more orange body coloration. However, outside of a mating context, both sexes prefer animate orange objects, which suggests that preference originally evolved in another context, like foraging. Orange fruits are a rare treat that fall into streams where the guppies live. The ability to find these fruits quickly is an adaptive quality that has evolved outside of a mating context. Sometime after the affinity for orange objects arose, male guppies exploited this preference by incorporating large orange spots to attract females.

Another example of sensory exploitation is seen in the water mite Neumania papillator, an ambush predator that hunts copepods (small crustaceans) passing by in the water column. When hunting, N. papillator adopts a characteristic stance termed the 'net stance' - their first four legs are held out into the water column, with their four hind legs resting on aquatic vegetation; this allows them to detect vibrational stimuli produced by swimming prey and use this to orient towards and clutch at prey. During courtship, males actively search for females - if a male finds a female, he slowly circles around the female whilst trembling his first and second leg near her. Male leg trembling causes females (who were in the 'net stance') to orient towards often clutch the male. This did not damage the male or deter further courtship; the male then deposited spermatophores and began to vigorously fan and jerk his fourth pair of legs over the spermatophore, generating a current of water that passed over the spermatophores and towards the female. Sperm packet uptake by the female would sometimes follow. Heather Proctor hypothesised that the vibrations trembling male legs made were done to mimic the vibrations that females detect from swimming prey - this would trigger the female prey-detection responses causing females to orient and then clutch at males, mediating courtship. If this was true and males were exploiting female predation responses, then hungry females should be more receptive to male trembling – Proctor found that unfed captive females did orient and clutch at males significantly more than fed captive females did, consistent with the sensory exploitation hypothesis.

Other examples for the sensory bias mechanism include traits in auklets, wolf spiders, and manakins. Further experimental work is required to reach a fuller understanding of the prevalence and mechanisms of sensory bias.

== Sexual conflict ==
Sexual conflict, in some form or another, may very well be inherent in the ways most animals reproduce. Females invest more in offspring prior to mating, due to the differences in gametes in species that exhibit anisogamy, and often invest more in offspring after mating. This unequal investment leads, on one hand, to intense competition between males for mates and, on the other hand, to females choosing among males for better access to resources and good genes. Because of differences in mating goals, males and females may have very different preferred outcomes to mating.

Sexual conflict occurs whenever the preferred mating outcome differs between males and females. This difference, in theory, should lead each sex to evolve adaptations that bias the outcome of reproduction towards its own interests. This sexual competition leads to sexually antagonistic coevolution between males and females, resulting in what has been described as an evolutionary arms race between males and females.

=== Conflict over mating ===
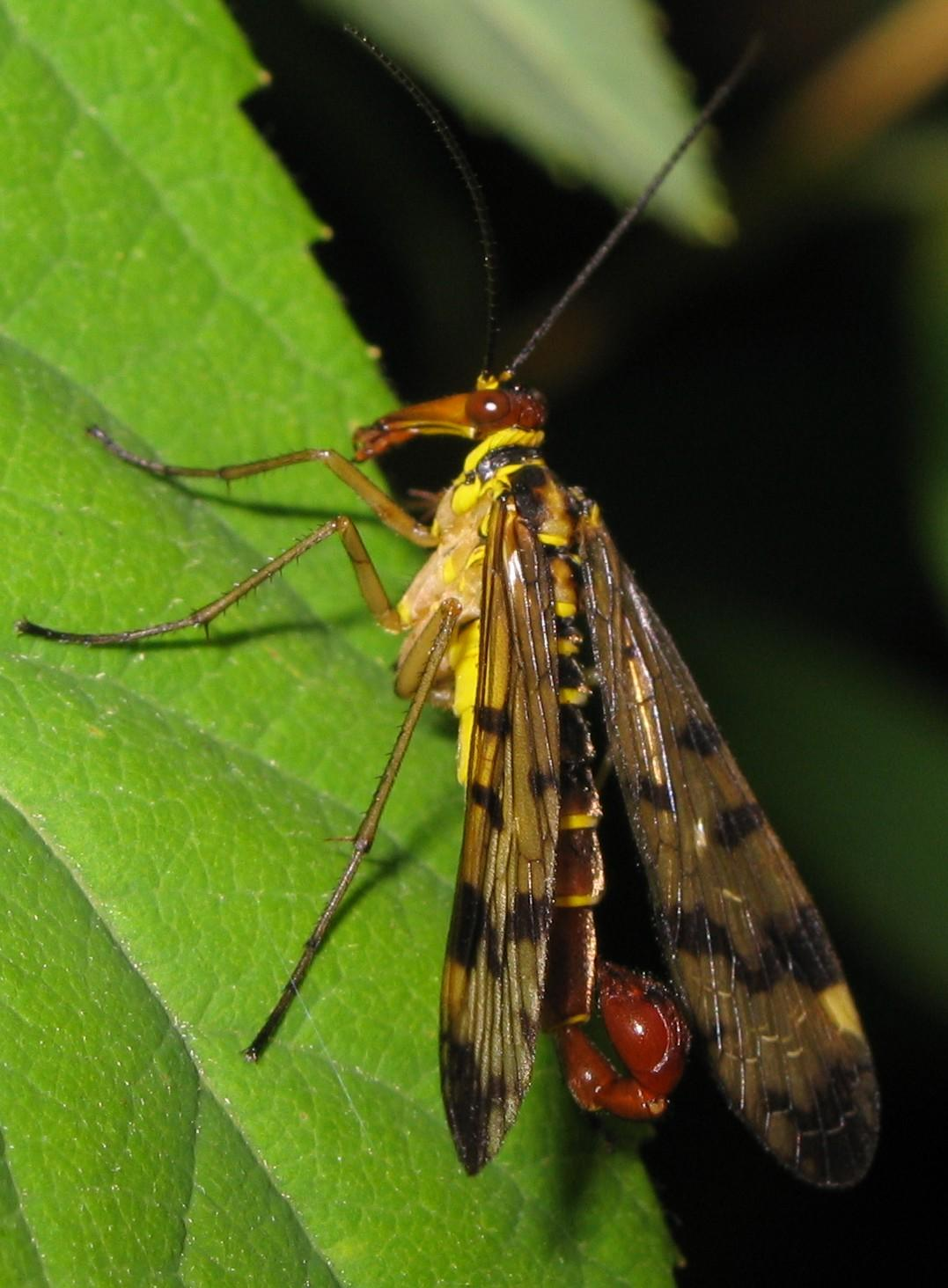
Male scorpionfly

Males' reproductive successes are often limited by access to mates, whereas females' reproductive successes are more often limited by access to resources. Thus, for a given sexual encounter, it benefits the male to mate, but benefits the female to be choosy and resist. For example, male small tortoiseshell butterflies compete to gain the best territory to mate. Another example of this conflict can be found in the Eastern carpenter bee, Xylocopa virginica. Males of this species are limited in reproduction primarily by access to mates, so they claim a territory and wait for a female to pass through. Big males are, therefore, more successful in mating because they claim territories near the female nesting sites that are more sought after. Smaller males, on the other hand, monopolize less competitive sites in foraging areas so that they may mate with reduced conflict. Another example of this is Sepsis cynipsea, where males of the species mount females to guard them from other males and remain on the female, attempting to copulate, until the female either shakes them off or consents to mating. Similarly the neriid fly Derocephalus angusticollis demonstrates mate guarding by using their long limbs to hold onto the female as well as push other males away during copulation. Extreme manifestations of this conflict are seen throughout nature. For example, the male Panorpa scorpionflies attempt to force copulation. Male scorpionflies usually acquire mates by presenting them with edible nuptial gifts in the form of salivary secretions or dead insects. However, some males attempt to force copulation by grabbing females with a specialized abdominal organ without offering a gift. Forced copulation is costly to the female as she does not receive the food from the male and has to search for food herself (costing time and energy), while it is beneficial for the male as he does not need to find a nuptial gift.

In other cases, however, it pays for the female to gain more matings, and for her social mate to prevent these, so as to guard paternity. For example, in many socially monogamous birds, males follow females closely during their fertile periods and attempt to chase away any other males to prevent extra-pair matings. The female may attempt to sneak off to achieve these extra matings. In species where males are incapable of constant guarding, the social male may frequently copulate with the female so as to swamp rival males' sperm.

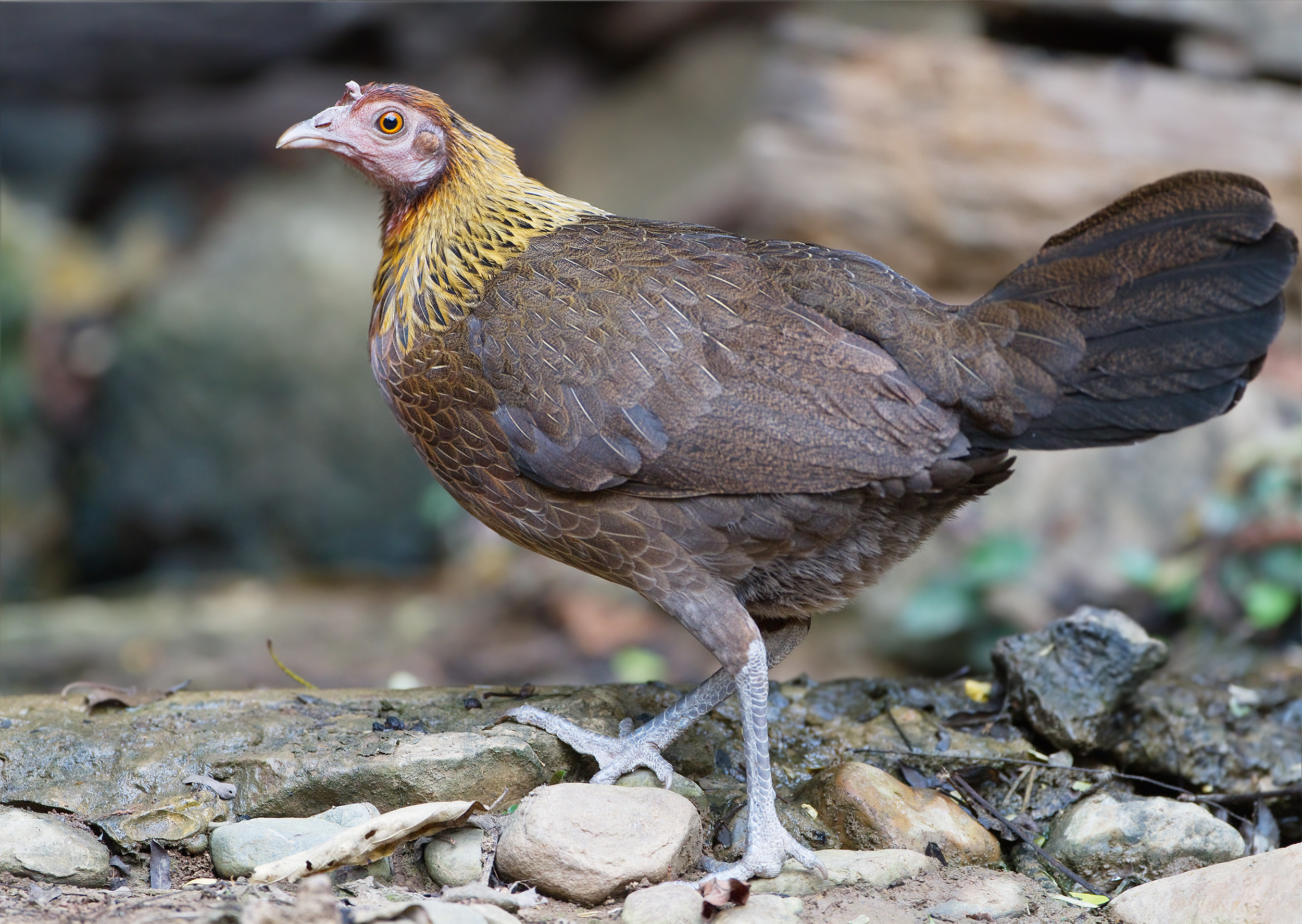
Female red junglefowl in Thailand

Sexual conflict after mating has also been observed in both males and females. Males employ a diverse array of tactics to increase their success in sperm competition. These can include removing other male's sperm from females, displacing other male's sperm by flushing out prior inseminations with large amounts of their own sperm, creating copulatory plugs in females' reproductive tracts to prevent future matings with other males, spraying females with anti-aphrodisiacs to discourage other males from mating with the female, and producing sterile parasperm to protect fertile eusperm in the female's reproductive tract. For example, the male spruce bud moth (Zeiraphera canadensis) secretes an accessory gland protein during mating that makes them unattractive to other males and thus prevents females from future copulation. The Rocky Mountain parnassian also exhibits this type of sexual conflict when the male butterflies deposit a waxy genital plug onto the tip of the female's abdomen that physically prevents the female from mating again. Males can also prevent future mating by transferring an anti-aphrodisiac to the female during mating. This behavior is seen in butterfly species such as Heliconius melpomene, where males transfer a compound that causes females to smell like males, thereby deterring potential mates. Furthermore, males may control the strategic allocation of sperm, producing more sperm when females are more promiscuous. All these methods are meant to ensure that females are more likely to produce offspring belonging to the males who uses the method.

Females also control the outcomes of matings, and there exists the possibility that females choose sperm (cryptic female choice). A dramatic example of this is the feral fowl Gallus gallus. In this species, females prefer to copulate with dominant males, but subordinate males can force matings. In these cases, the female is able to eject the subordinate male's sperm using cloacal contractions.

== Parental care and family conflicts ==
Parental care is the investment a parent puts into their offspring—which includes protecting and feeding the young, preparing burrows or nests, and providing eggs with yolk. There is great variation in parental care in the animal kingdom. In some species, the parents may not care for their offspring at all, while in others the parents exhibit single-parental or even bi-parental care. As with other topics in behavioral ecology, interactions within a family involve conflicts. These conflicts can be broken down into three general types: sexual (male–female) conflict, parent–offspring conflict, and sibling conflict.

=== Types of parental care ===
There are many different patterns of parental care in the animal kingdom. The patterns can be explained by physiological constraints or ecological conditions, such as mating opportunities. In invertebrates, parental care is absent in most species because it is more favorable for parents to produce many eggs whose fate is left to chance than to protect a few individual young. In other cases, parental care is indirect, manifested via actions taken before the offspring is produced, but nonetheless essential for their survival; for example, female Lasioglossum figueresi sweat bees excavate a nest, construct brood cells, and stock the cells with pollen and nectar before they lay their eggs, so when the larvae hatch they are sheltered and fed, but the females die without ever interacting with their brood. In birds, biparental care is the most common, because reproductive success directly depends on the parents' ability to feed their chicks. Two parents can feed twice as many young, so it is more favorable for birds to have both parents delivering food. In mammals, female-only care is the most common. This is most likely because females are internally fertilized and therefore hold the young inside for a prolonged period of gestation, which provides males with the opportunity to desert. Females also feed the young through lactation after birth, so males are not required for feeding. Male parental care is only observed in species where they contribute to feeding or carrying of the young, such as in marmosets. In fish there is no parental care in 79% of bony fish. In fish with parental care, it usually limited to selecting, preparing, and defending a nest, as seen in sockeye salmon, for example. Also, parental care in fish, if any, is primarily done by males, as seen in gobies and redlip blennies. The cichlid fish V. moorii exhibits biparental care. In species with internal fertilization, the female is usually the one to take care of the young. In cases where fertilization is external the male becomes the main caretaker.

=== Familial conflict ===
Familial conflict is a result of trade-offs as a function of lifetime parental investment. Parental investment was defined by Robert Trivers in 1972 as "any investment by the parent in an individual offspring that increases the offspring's chance of surviving (and hence reproductive success) at the cost of the parent's ability to invest in other offspring". Parental investment includes behaviors like guarding and feeding. Each parent has a limited amount of parental investment over their lifetime. Investment trade-offs in offspring quality and quantity within a brood, and between current and future broods, lead to conflict over how much parental investment to provide and to whom parents should invest. There are three major types of familial conflict: sexual, parent–offspring, and sibling–sibling conflict.

==== Sexual conflict ====
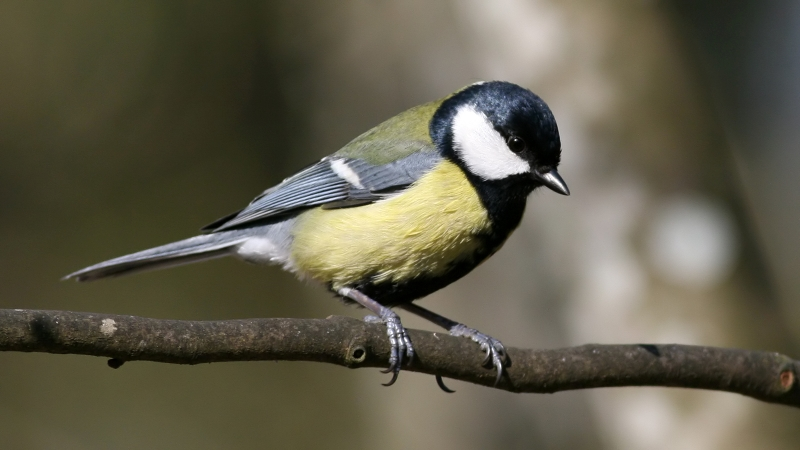
Great tit

There is conflict among parents over who should provide care and how much care to provide. Each parent must decide whether to stay and care for their offspring or desert them. This decision is best modeled by game-theoretic approaches to evolutionarily stable strategies (ESS), in which the best strategy for one parent depends on the strategy adopted by the other parent. Recent research has found response matching in parents who determine how much care to invest in their offspring. Studies found that parent great tits match their partner's increased care-giving efforts with increased provisioning rates of their own. This cued parental response is a type of behavioral negotiation between parents that leads to stabilized compensation. Sexual conflicts can give rise to antagonistic co-evolution between the sexes to try to get the other sex to care more for offspring. For example, in the waltzing fly Prochyliza xanthostoma, ejaculate feeding maximizes female reproductive success and minimizes the female's chance of mating multiple times. Evidence suggests that the sperm evolved to prevent female waltzing flies from mating multiply in order to ensure the male's paternity.

==== Parent–offspring conflict ====
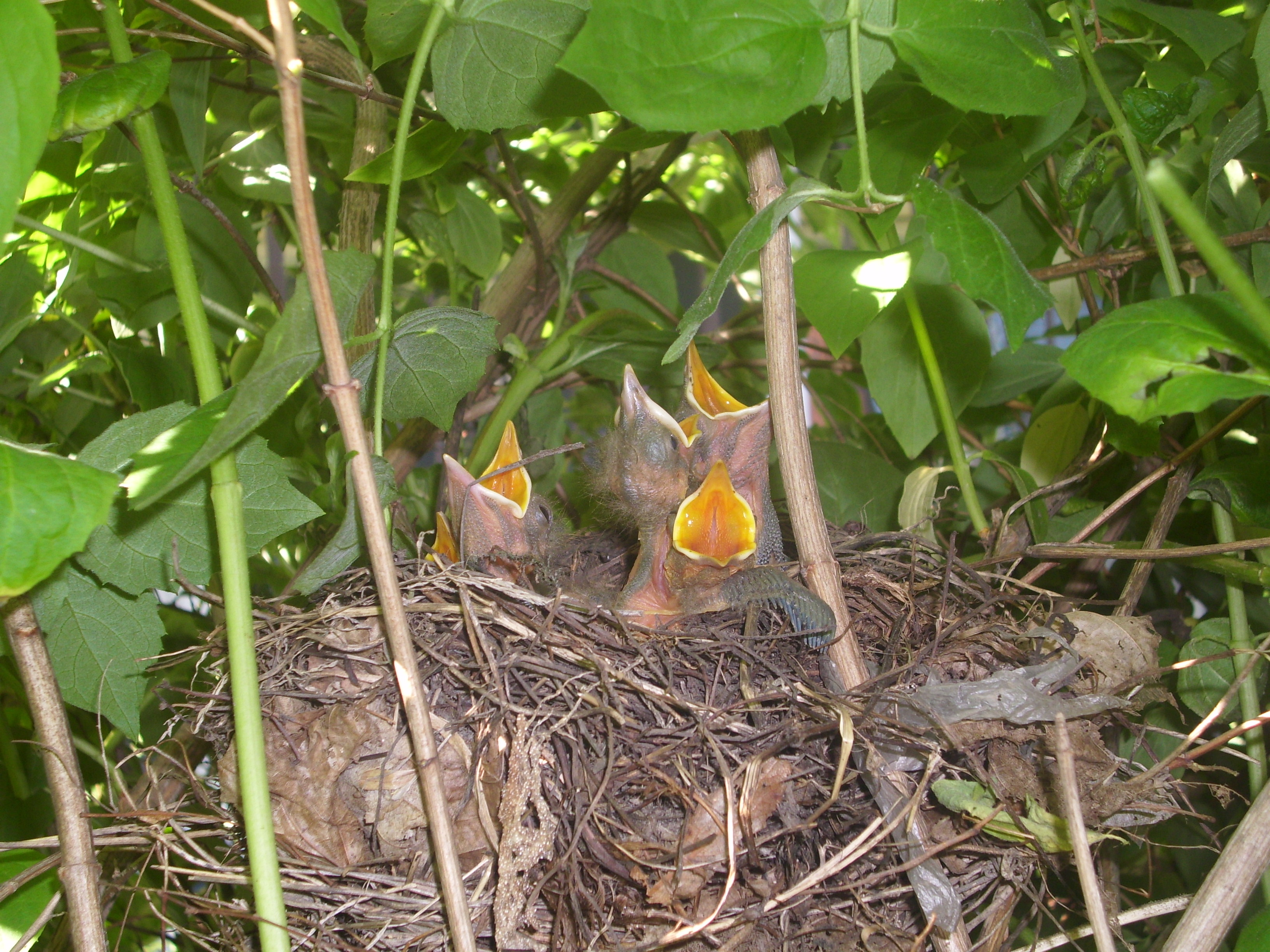
Blackbird chicks in a nest

According to Robert Trivers's theory on relatedness, each offspring is related to itself by 1, but is only 0.5 related to its parents and siblings. Genetically, offspring are predisposed to behave in their own self-interest while parents are predisposed to behave equally to all their offspring, including both current and future ones. Offspring selfishly try to take more than their fair share of parental investment, while parents try to spread their parental investment equally amongst their present young and future young. There are many examples of parent–offspring conflict in nature. One manifestation of this is asynchronous hatching in birds. A behavioral ecology hypothesis is known as Lack's brood reduction hypothesis (named after David Lack). Lack's hypothesis posits an evolutionary and ecological explanation as to why birds lay a series of eggs with an asynchronous delay leading to nestlings of mixed age and weights. According to Lack, this brood behavior is an ecological insurance that allows the larger birds to survive in poor years and all birds to survive when food is plentiful. We also see sex-ratio conflict between the queen and her workers in social hymenoptera. Because of haplodiploidy, the workers (offspring) prefer a 3:1 female to male sex allocation while the queen prefers a 1:1 sex ratio. Both the queen and the workers try to bias the sex ratio in their favor. In some species, the workers gain control of the sex ratio, while in other species, like B. terrestris, the queen has a considerable amount of control over the colony's sex ratio. Lastly, there has been recent evidence regarding genomic imprinting that is a result of parent–offspring conflict. Paternal genes in offspring demand more maternal resources than maternal genes in the same offspring and vice versa. This has been shown in imprinted genes like insulin-like growth factor-II.

==== Parent–offspring conflict resolution ====
Parents need an honest signal from their offspring that indicates their level of hunger or need, so that the parents can distribute resources accordingly. Offspring want more than their fair share of resources, so they exaggerate their signals to wheedle more parental investment. However, this conflict is countered by the cost of excessive begging. Not only does excessive begging attract predators, but it also retards chick growth if begging goes unrewarded. Thus, the cost of increased begging enforces offspring honesty.

Another resolution to parent–offspring conflict is that parental provisioning and offspring demand have coevolved, so there is no obvious underlying conflict. Cross-fostering experiments in great tits (Parus major) have shown that offspring beg more when their biological mothers are more generous. Therefore, it seems that the willingness to invest in offspring is co-adapted to offspring demand.

==== Sibling–sibling conflict ====
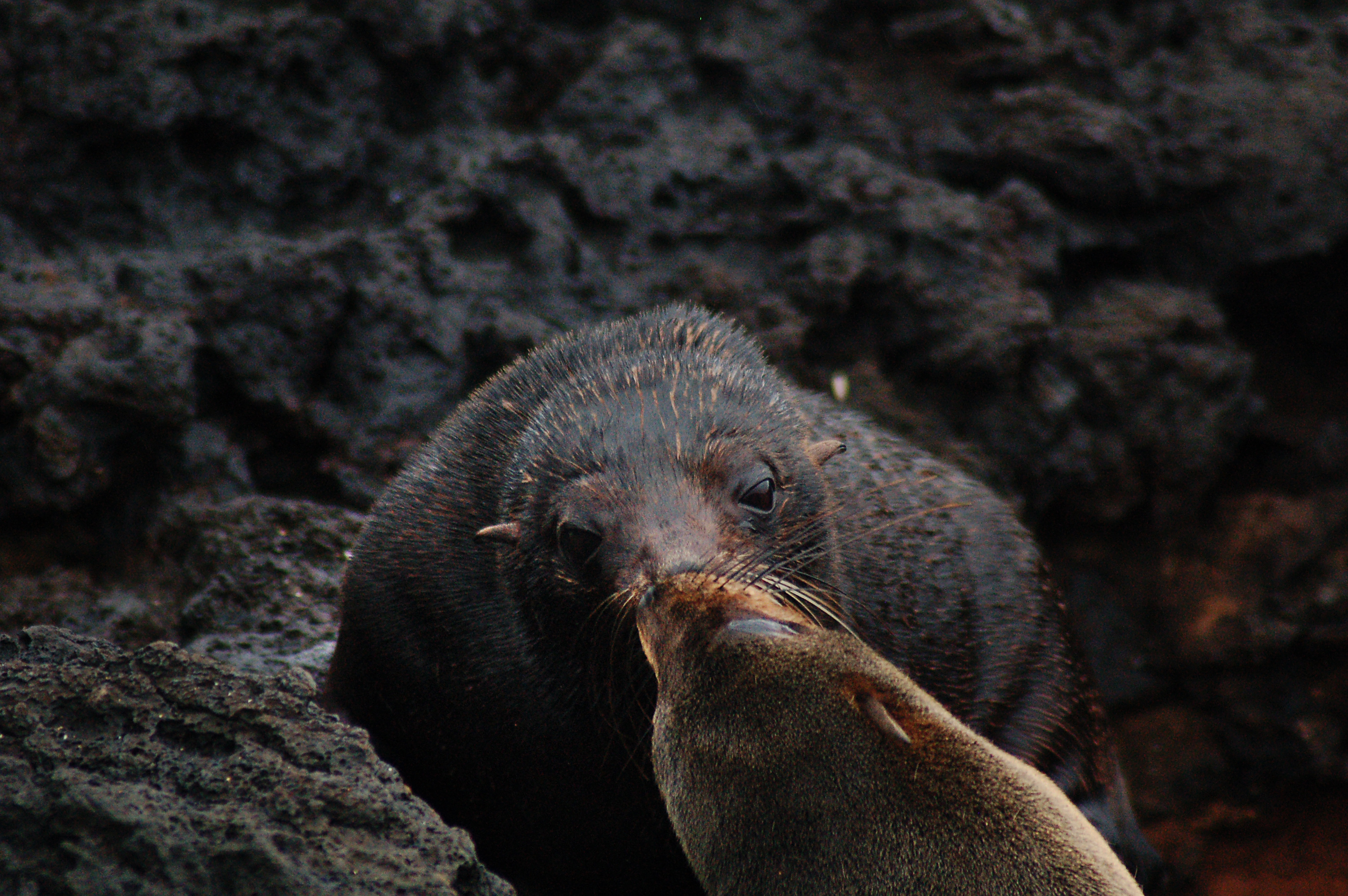
Galápagos fur seals

The lifetime parental investment is the fixed amount of parental resources available for all of a parent's young, and an offspring wants as much of it as possible. Siblings in a brood often compete for parental resources by trying to gain more than their fair share of what their parents can offer. Nature provides numerous examples in which sibling rivalry escalates to such an extreme that one sibling tries to kill off broodmates to maximize parental investment (See Siblicide). In the Galápagos fur seal, the second pup of a female is usually born when the first pup is still suckling. This competition for the mother's milk is especially fierce during periods of food shortage, such as an El Niño year, and this usually results in the older pup directly attacking and killing the younger one.

In some bird species, sibling rivalry is also abetted by the asynchronous hatching of eggs. In the blue-footed booby, for example, the first egg in a nest is hatched four days before the second one, resulting in the elder chick having a four-day head start in growth. When the elder chick falls 20-25% below its expected weight threshold, it attacks its younger sibling and drives it from the nest.

Sibling relatedness in a brood also influences the level of sibling–sibling conflict. In a study on passerine birds, it was found that chicks begged more loudly in species with higher levels of extra-pair paternity.

=== Brood parasitism ===
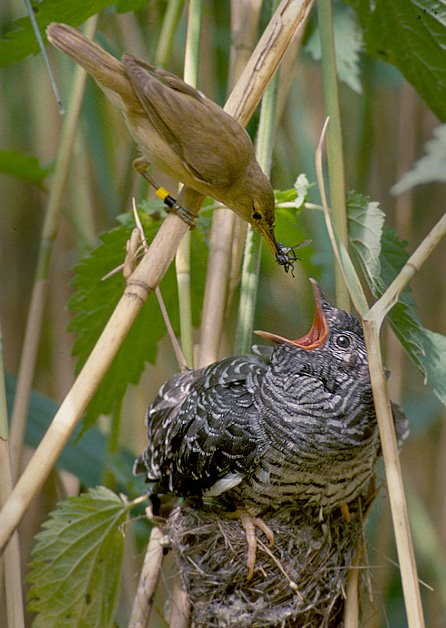
Adult reed warbler feeding a common cuckoo chick

Some animals deceive other species into providing all parental care. These brood parasites selfishly exploit their hosts' parents and host offspring. The common cuckoo is a well-known example of a brood parasite. Female cuckoos lay a single egg in the nest of the host species and when the cuckoo chick hatches, it ejects all the host eggs and young. Other examples of brood parasites include honeyguides, cowbirds, and the large blue butterfly. Brood parasite offspring have many strategies to induce their host parents to invest in parental care. Studies show that the common cuckoo uses vocal mimicry to imitate the sound of multiple hungry host young to solicit more food. Other cuckoos use visual deception with their wings to exaggerate the begging display. False gapes from brood parasite offspring cause host parents to collect more food. Another example of a brood parasite is Phengaris butterflies such as Phengaris rebeli and Phengaris arion, which differ from the cuckoo in that the butterflies do not oviposit directly in the nest of the host, an ant species Myrmica schencki. Rather, the butterfly larvae release chemicals that deceive the ants into believing that they are ant larvae, causing the ants to bring the butterfly larvae back to their own nests to feed them. Other examples of brood parasites are Polistes sulcifer, a paper wasp that has lost the ability to build its own nests so females lay their eggs in the nest of a host species, Polistes dominula, and rely on the host workers to take care of their brood, as well as Bombus bohemicus, a bumblebee that relies on host workers of various other Bombus species. Similarly, in Eulaema meriana, some Leucospidae wasps exploit the brood cells and nest for shelter and food from the bees. Vespula austriaca is another wasp in which the females force the host workers to feed and take care of the brood. In particular, Bombus hyperboreus, an Arctic bee species, is also classified as a brood parasite in that it attacks and enslaves other species within their subgenus, Alpinobombus to propagate their population.

== Mating systems ==
Various types of mating systems include monogamy, polygyny, polyandry, and promiscuity. Each is differentiated by the sexual behavior between mates, such as which males mate with certain females. An influential paper by Stephen Emlen and Lewis Oring (1977) argued that two main factors of animal behavior influence the diversity of mating systems: the relative accessibility that each sex has to mates, and the parental desertion by either sex.

=== Mating systems with no male parental care ===
In a system without male parental care, resource dispersion, predation, and the effects of social living primarily influence female dispersion, which in turn influences male dispersion. Since males' primary concern is acquiring females, they either directly or indirectly compete for them. In direct competition, the males are directly focused on the females. Blue-headed wrasse demonstrate the behavior in which females follow resources—such as good nest sites—and males follow the females. Conversely, species with males that exemplify indirectly competitive behavior tend towards the males' anticipation of the resources desired by females and their subsequent effort to control or acquire these resources, which helps them to achieve success with females. Grey-sided voles demonstrate indirect male competition for females. The males were experimentally observed to home in on sites with the best food in anticipation of females settling in these areas. Males of Euglossa imperialis, a non-social bee species, also demonstrate indirect competitive behavior by forming aggregations of territories, which can be considered leks, to defend fragrant-rich primary territories. The purpose of these aggregations is largely only facultative, since the more suitable fragrant-rich sites there are, the more habitable territories there are to inhabit, giving females of this species a large selection of males with whom to potentially mate. Leks and choruses have also been deemed another behavior among the phenomena of male competition for females. Because the territories lekking males often defend are resource-poor, it is difficult to categorize them as indirect competitors. For example, male ghost moths display in leks to attract females. Additionally, it is difficult to classify them as direct competitors seeing as they put a great deal of effort into their defense of their territories before females arrive, and upon female arrival they put forth great mating displays to attract the females to their individual sites. These observations make it difficult to determine whether female or resource dispersion primarily influences male aggregation, especially in light of the apparent difficulty that males may have defending resources and females in such densely populated areas. Because the reason for male aggregation into leks is unclear, five hypotheses have been proposed. These postulates propose the following as reasons for male lekking: hotspot, predation reduction, increased female attraction, hotshot males, facilitation of female choice. With all of the mating behaviors discussed, the primary factors influencing differences within and between species are ecology, social conflicts, and life history differences.

In some other instances, neither direct nor indirect competition is seen. Instead, in species like the Edith's checkerspot butterfly, males' efforts are directed at acquisition of females and they exhibit indiscriminate mate location behavior, where, given the low cost of mistakes, they blindly attempt to mate both correctly with females and incorrectly with other objects.

=== Mating systems with male parental care ===
==== Monogamy ====
Monogamy is the mating system in 90% of birds, possibly because each male and female has a greater number of offspring if they share in raising a brood. In obligate monogamy, males feed females on the nest or share in incubation and chick-feeding. In some species, males and females form lifelong pair bonds. Monogamy may also arise from limited opportunities for polygamy, due to strong competition among males for mates, females suffering from loss of male help, and female–female aggression.

==== Polygyny ====
In birds, polygyny occurs when males indirectly monopolize females by controlling resources. In species where males normally do not contribute much to parental care, females suffer relatively little or not at all. In other species, however, females suffer through the loss of male contribution, and the cost of having to share resources that the male controls, such as nest sites or food. In some cases, a polygynous male may control a high-quality territory so for the female, the benefits of polygyny may outweigh the costs.

==== Polyandry threshold ====
There also seems to be a "polyandry threshold" where males may do better by agreeing to share a female instead of maintaining a monogamous mating system. Situations that may lead to cooperation among males include when food is scarce, and when there is intense competition for territories or females. For example, male lions sometimes form coalitions to gain control of a pride of females. In some populations of Galapagos hawks, groups of males would cooperate to defend one breeding territory. The males would share matings with the female and share paternity with the offspring.

==== Female desertion and sex role reversal ====
In birds, desertion often happens when food is abundant, so the remaining partner is better able to raise the young unaided. Desertion also occurs if there is a great chance of a parent to gain another mate, which depends on environmental and population factors. Some birds, such as the phalaropes, have reversed sex roles where the female is larger and more brightly colored, and compete for males to incubate their clutches. In jacanas, the female is larger than the male and her territory could overlap the multiple territories of up to four males. In the frog species P. bibronii, the female is fertilizes multiple nests, and the male is left to tend to each nest while the female moves on.

== Social behaviors ==
Animals cooperate with each other to increase their own fitness. These altruistic, and sometimes spiteful behaviors can be explained by Hamilton's rule, which states that rB-C > 0 where r= relatedness, B= benefits, and C= costs.

=== Kin selection ===
Kin selection refers to evolutionary strategies where an individual acts to favor the reproductive success of relatives, or kin, even if the action incurs some cost to the organism's own survival and ability to procreate. John Maynard Smith coined the term in 1964, although the concept was referred to by Charles Darwin who cited that helping relatives would be favored by group selection. Mathematical descriptions of kin selection were initially offered by R. A. Fisher in 1930 and J. B. S. Haldane in 1932. and 1955. W. D. Hamilton popularized the concept later, including the mathematical treatment by George Price in 1963 and 1964.

Kin selection predicts that individuals will incur personal costs to benefit one or more individuals because this can maximize their genetic contribution to future generations. For example, an organism may be inclined to expend great time and energy in parental investment to rear offspring since this future generation may be better suited for propagating genes that are highly shared between the parent and offspring. Ultimately, the initial actor performs apparent altruistic actions for kin to enhance its own reproductive fitness. In particular, organisms are hypothesized to act in favor of kin depending on their genetic relatedness. So, individuals are inclined to act altruistically for siblings, grandparents, cousins, and other relatives, but to differing degrees.

==== Inclusive fitness ====
Inclusive fitness describes the component of reproductive success in both a focal individual and their relatives. Importantly, the measure embodies the sum of direct and indirect fitness and the change in their reproductive success based on the actor's behavior. That is, the effect an individual's behaviors have on: being personally better-suited to reproduce offspring, and aiding descendant and non-descendant relatives in their reproductive efforts. Natural selection is predicted to push individuals to behave in ways that maximize their inclusive fitness. Studying inclusive fitness is often done using predictions from Hamilton's rule.

=== Kin recognition ===
==== Genetic cues ====
One possible method of kin selection is based on genetic cues that can be recognized phenotypically. Genetic recognition has been exemplified in a species that is usually not thought of as a social creature: amoebae. Social amoebae form fruiting bodies when starved for food. These amoebae preferentially formed slugs and fruiting bodies with members of their own lineage, which is clonally related. The genetic cue comes from variable lag genes, which are involved in signaling and adhesion between cells.

Kin can also be recognized as a genetically determined odor, as studied in the primitively social sweat bee, Lasioglossum zephyrus. These bees can even recognize relatives they have never met and roughly determine relatedness. The Brazilian stingless bee Schwarziana quadripunctata uses a distinct combination of chemical hydrocarbons to recognize and locate kin. Each chemical odor, emitted from the organism's epicuticles, is unique and varies according to age, sex, location, and hierarchical position. Similarly, individuals of the stingless bee species Trigona fulviventris can distinguish kin from non-kin through recognition of a number of compounds, including hydrocarbons and fatty acids that are present in their wax and floral oils from plants used to construct their nests. In the species, Osmia rufa, kin selection has also been associated with mating selection. Females, specifically, select males for mating with whom they are genetically more related to.

Some animals recognize kin by "self-referencing": comparing others' phenotypes to their own. For example, Belding's ground squirrels recognize relatives by comparing their own odor and those of littermates with odors of squirrels they encounter. These phenotypes come in the form of scent from dorsal and anal glands, and each animal has its own repertoire of odors. If another individual's odor phenotype closely matches one's own, it is likely a relative. Laboratory tests indicate that females can discriminate between kin and nonkin, close and distant relatives, and, within litters, between full-siblings and maternal half-siblings. Field observations confirm that females cooperate with their closest kin more than with distant kin, and behave aggressively toward nonrelatives. Golden hamsters and bluegill sunfish also can use themselves as referents to discriminate close relatives from distant kin and nonkin.

==== Environmental cues ====
There are two simple rules that many animals follow to determine who is kin. These rules can be exploited, but they exist because they are generally successful.

The first rule is 'treat anyone in my home as kin.' This rule is readily seen in the reed warbler, a bird species that focuses only on chicks in its own nest. If its own kin is placed outside of the nest, a parent bird ignores that chick. This rule can sometimes lead to odd results, especially if a parasitic bird lays eggs in a reed warbler nest. For example, an adult cuckoo may sneak its egg into the nest. Once the cuckoo hatches, the reed warbler parent feeds the invading bird like its own child. Even with the risk of exploitation, the rule generally proves successful.

The second rule, named by Konrad Lorenz as 'imprinting,' states that those you grow up with are kin. Several species exhibit this behavior, including, but not limited to the Belding's ground squirrel. Experimentation with these squirrels showed that regardless of true genetic relatedness, those that were reared together rarely fought. Further research suggests that there is some genetic recognition as well, as siblings raised apart were less aggressive toward one another than non-relatives reared apart.

Another way animals may recognize their kin is through the interchange of unique signals. While song singing is often considered a sexual trait between males and females, male–male song singing also occurs. For example, male vinegar flies Zaprionus tuberculatus can recognize each other by song.

=== Cooperation ===
Cooperation is broadly defined as behavior that provides a benefit to another individual that specifically evolved for that benefit. This excludes behavior that has not been expressly selected for to provide a benefit for another individual, because there are many commensal and parasitic relationships where the behavior of one individual (which has evolved to benefit that individual and no others) is taken advantage of by other organisms. Stable cooperative behavior requires that it provide a benefit to both the actor and the recipient, though the benefit to the actor can take many different forms.

==== Within species ====
Within species, cooperation occurs among members of the same species. Examples of intraspecific cooperation include cooperative breeding (e.g., in weeper capuchins) and cooperative foraging (e.g., in wolves). There are also forms of cooperative defense mechanisms, such as the "fighting swarm" behavior used by the stingless bee Tetragonula carbonaria. Much of this behavior occurs due to kin selection. Kin selection allows cooperative behavior to evolve even when the actor receives no direct benefit from the cooperation.

Cooperation (without kin selection) must evolve to benefit both the actor and the recipient of the behavior. This includes reciprocity, in which the recipient of cooperative behavior repays the actor later. This may occur in vampire bats but it is uncommon in non-human animals. Cooperation can occur willingly between individuals when both benefit directly as well. Cooperative breeding, where one individual cares for the offspring of another, occurs in several species, including wedge-capped capuchin monkeys.

Cooperative behavior may also be enforced, with failure to cooperate resulting in negative consequences. One of the best examples of this is worker policing, which occurs in social insect colonies.

The cooperative pulling paradigm is a popular experimental design used to assess if and under which conditions animals cooperate. It involves two or more animals pulling rewards towards themselves using an apparatus they cannot successfully operate alone.

==== Between species ====
Cooperation can occur between members of different species. For interspecific cooperation to be evolutionarily stable, it must benefit individuals in both species. Examples include pistol shrimp and goby fish, nitrogen-fixing microbes and legumes, ants and aphids. In ants and aphids, aphids secrete a sugary liquid called honeydew, which ants eat. The ants protect aphids from predators and, in some instances, raise aphid eggs and larvae within the ant colony. This behavior is analogous to human domestication. The genus of goby fish, Elacatinus also demonstrate cooperation by removing and feeding on ectoparasites of their clients. The species of wasp Polybia rejecta and ants Azteca chartifex show a cooperative behavior protecting one another's nests from predators.

Market economics often govern the details of the cooperation: e.g., the amount exchanged between individual animals follows the rules of supply and demand.

=== Spite ===
Hamilton's rule can also predict spiteful behaviors between non-relatives. A spiteful behavior is one that is harmful to both the actor and the recipient. Spiteful behavior is favored if the actor is less related to the recipient than to the average member of the population, making r negative and if rB-C is still greater than zero. Spite can also be thought of as a type of altruism because harming a non-relative, by taking his resources for example, could also benefit a relative, by allowing him access to those resources. Furthermore, certain spiteful behaviors may provide harmful short-term consequences to the actor but also give long-term reproductive benefits. Many behaviors that are commonly thought of as spiteful are actually better explained as being selfish, that is benefiting the actor and harming the recipient, and true spiteful behaviors are rare in the animal kingdom.

An example of spite is the sterile soldiers of the polyembryonic parasitoid wasp. A female wasp lays a male and a female egg in a caterpillar. The eggs divide asexually, creating many genetically identical male and female larvae. Sterile soldier wasps also develop and attack the relatively unrelated brother larvae so that the genetically identical sisters have more access to food.

Another example is bacteria that release bacteriocins. The bacteria that release the bacteriocin may have to die to do so, but most of the harm is to unrelated individuals who are killed by the bacteriocin. This is because the ability to produce and release the bacteriocin is linked to an immunity to it. Therefore, close relatives of the releasing cell are less likely to die than non-relatives.

== Altruism and conflict in social insects ==
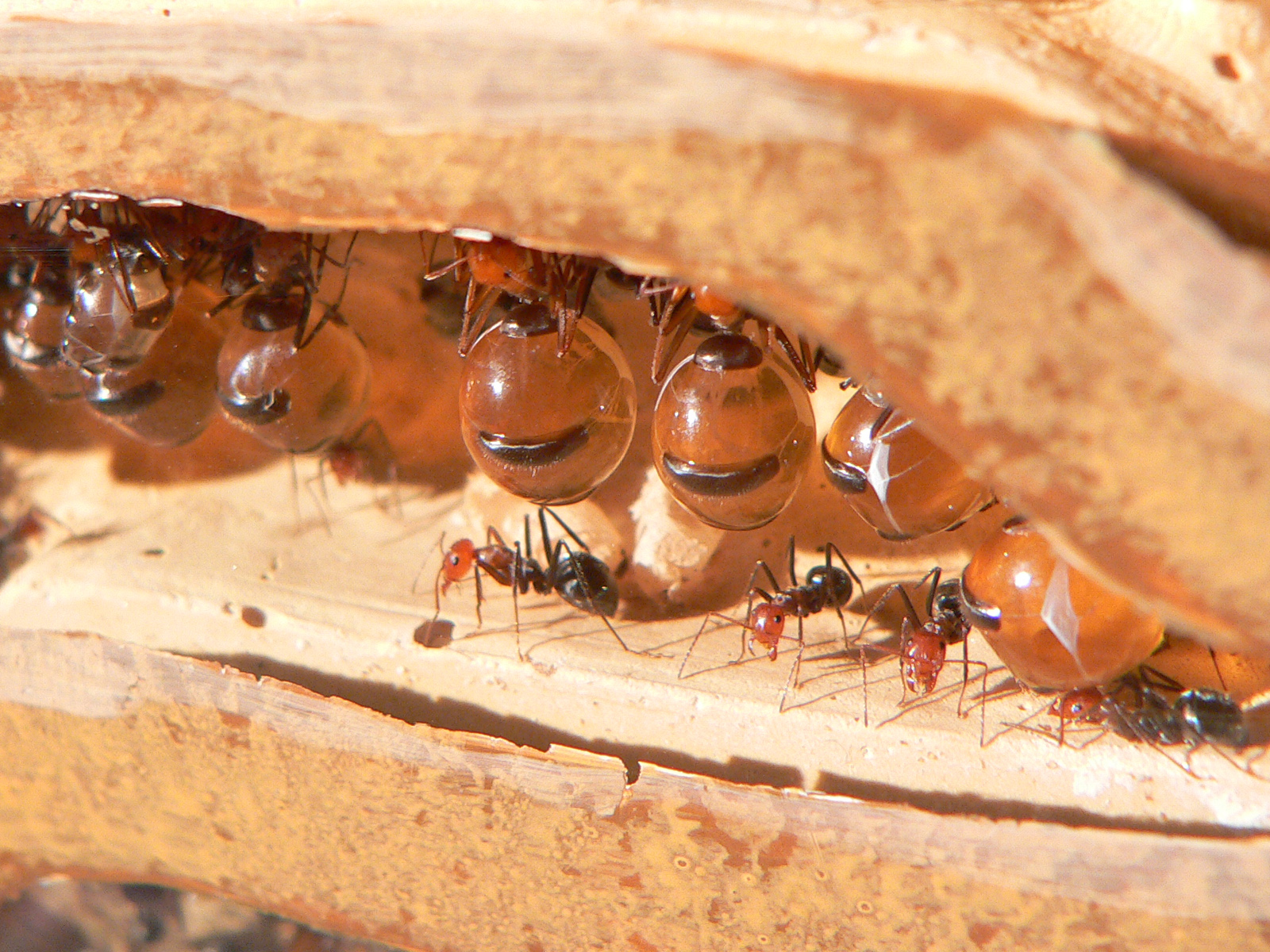
Honeypot ant

Many insect species of the order Hymenoptera (bees, ants, wasps) are eusocial. Within the nests or hives of social insects, individuals perform specialized tasks to ensure the colony's survival. Dramatic examples of these specializations include changes in body morphology or unique behaviors, such as the engorged bodies of the honeypot ant Myrmecocystus mexicanus or the waggle dance of honey bees and a wasp species, Vespula vulgaris.

In many, but not all social insects, reproduction is monopolized by the queen of the colony. Due to the effects of a haplodiploid mating system, in which unfertilized eggs become male drones and fertilized eggs become worker females, average relatedness values between sister workers can be higher than those seen in humans or other eutherian mammals. This has led to the suggestion that kin selection may be a driving force in the evolution of eusociality, as individuals could provide cooperative care that establishes a favorable benefit-to-cost ratio (rB-c > 0). However, not all social insects follow this rule. In the social wasp Polistes dominula, 35% of the nest mates are unrelated. In many other species, unrelated individuals only help the queen when no other options are present. In this case, subordinates work for unrelated queens even when other options may be present. No other social insect submits to unrelated queens in this way. This seemingly unfavorable behavior parallels some vertebrate systems. It is thought that this unrelated assistance is evidence of altruism in P. dominula.

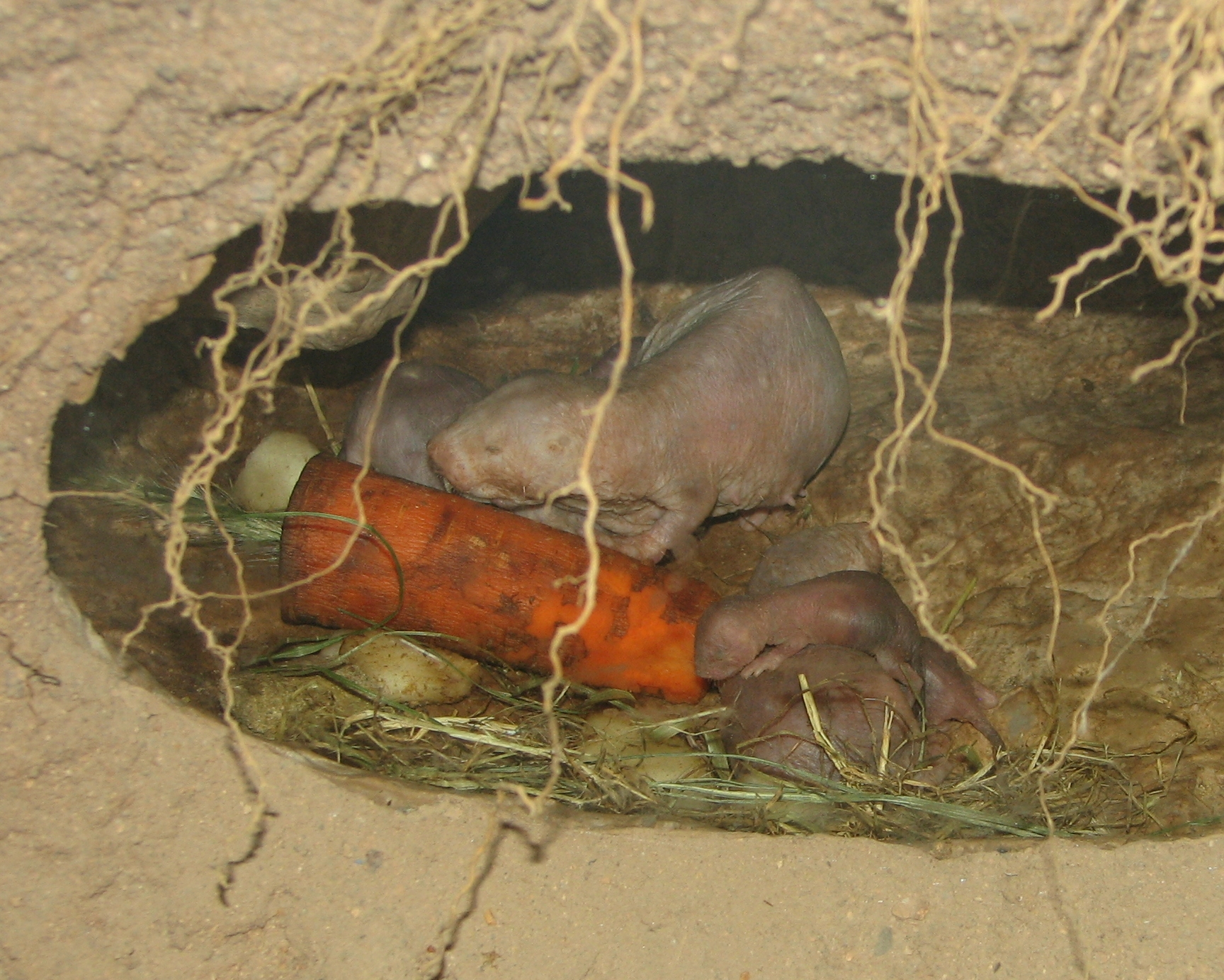
Naked mole-rats

Cooperation in social organisms is shaped by numerous ecological factors that determine the benefits and costs of this form of organization. One suggested benefit is a type of "life insurance" for individuals who participate in the care of the young. In this instance, individuals may be more likely to transmit genes to the next generation when helping in a group than when reproducing individually. Another suggested benefit is the possibility of "fortress defense", where soldier castes threaten or attack intruders, thus protecting related individuals inside the territory. Such behaviors are seen in the snapping shrimp Synalpheus regalis, a gall-forming aphid Pemphigus spyrothecae., and naked mole-rats. A third ecological factor that is posited to promote eusociality is the distribution of resources: when food is sparse and concentrated in patches, eusociality is favored. Evidence supporting this third factor comes from studies of naked mole-rats and Damaraland mole-rats, which have communities containing a single pair of reproductive individuals.

=== Conflicts in social insects ===
Although eusociality has been shown to offer many benefits to the colony, there is also potential for conflict. Examples include the sex-ratio conflict and worker policing seen in certain species of social Hymenoptera such as Dolichovespula media, Dolichovespula sylvestris, Dolichovespula norwegica and Vespula vulgaris. The queen and the worker wasps either indirectly kill the laying-workers' offspring by neglecting them or directly condemn them by cannibalizing and scavenging.

The sex-ratio conflict arises from a relatedness asymmetry, which is caused by the haplodiploidy nature of Hymenoptera. For instance, workers are most related to each other because they share half of the genes from the queen and inherit all of the father's genes. Their total relatedness to each other would be 0.5+ (0.5 x 0.5) = 0.75. Thus, sisters are three-fourths related to each other. On the other hand, males arise from unfertilized larva, meaning they only inherit half of the queen's genes and none from the father. As a result, a female is related to her brother by 0.25, because 50% of her genes that come from her father have no chance of being shared with a brother. Her relatedness to her brother would therefore be 0.5 x 0.5=0.25.

According to Trivers and Hare's population-level sex-investment ratio theory, the ratio of relatedness between sexes determines the sex investment ratios. As a result, it has been observed that there is a tug-of-war between the queen and the workers, where the queen would prefer a 1:1 female to male ratio because she is equally related to her sons and daughters (r=0.5 in each case). However, the workers would prefer a 3:1 female to male ratio because they are 0.75 related to each other and only 0.25 related to their brothers. Allozyme data of a colony may indicate who wins this conflict.

Conflict can also arise between workers in colonies of social insects. In some species, worker females retain their ability to mate and lay eggs. The colony's queen is related to her sons by half of her genes and a quarter to the sons of her worker daughters. Workers, however, are related to their sons by half of their genes and to their brothers by a quarter. Thus, the queen and her worker daughters would compete for reproduction to maximize their own reproductive fitness. Worker reproduction is limited by other workers who are more related to the queen than their sisters, a situation occurring in many polyandrous hymenopteran species. Workers police the egg-laying females by engaging in oophagy or directed acts of aggression.

=== The monogamy hypothesis ===
The monogamy hypothesis states that the presence of monogamy in insects is crucial for eusociality to occur. This is thought to be true because of Hamilton's rule that states that rB-C>0. By having a monogamous mating system, all of the offspring have high relatedness to each other. This means that it is equally beneficial to help out a sibling, as it is to help out an offspring. If there were many fathers the relatedness of the colony would be lowered.

This monogamous mating system has been observed in insects such as termites, ants, bees and wasps. In termites the queen commits to a single male when founding a nest. In ants, bees and wasps the queens have a functional equivalent to lifetime monogamy. The male can even die before the founding of the colony. The queen can store and use the sperm from a single male throughout their lifetime, sometimes up to 30 years.

In an experiment looking at the mating of 267 hymenopteran species, the results were mapped onto a phylogeny. It was found that monogamy was the ancestral state in all the independent transitions to eusociality. This indicates that monogamy is the ancestral, likely to be crucial state for the development of eusociality. In species where queens mated with multiple mates, it was found that these were developed from lineages where sterile castes already evolved, so the multiple mating was secondary. In these cases, multiple mating is likely to be advantageous for reasons other than those important at the origin of eusociality. Most likely reasons are that a diverse worker pool attained by multiple mating by the queen increases disease resistance and may facilitate a division of labor among workers

== Communication and signaling ==
Communication is varied at all scales of life, from interactions between microscopic organisms to those of large groups of people. Nevertheless, the signals used in communication abide by a fundamental property: they must be a quality of the receiver that can transfer information to a receiver that is capable of interpreting the signal and modifying its behavior accordingly. Signals are distinct from cues in that evolution has selected for signalling between both parties, whereas cues are merely informative to the observer and may not have originally been used for the intended purpose. The natural world is replete with examples of signals, from the luminescent flashes of light from fireflies, to chemical signaling in red harvester ants to prominent mating displays of birds such as the Guianan cock-of-the-rock, which gather in leks, the pheromones released by the corn earworm moth, the dancing patterns of the blue-footed booby, or the alarm sound Synoeca cyanea make by rubbing their mandibles against their nest. Yet other examples are the cases of the grizzled skipper and Spodoptera littoralis where pheromones are released as a sexual recognition mechanism that drives evolution. In a type of mating signal, male orb-weaving spiders of the species Zygiella x-notata pluck the signal thread of a female's web with their forelegs. This performance conveys vibratory signals informing the female spider of the male's presence.

The nature of communication poses evolutionary concerns, such as the potential for deceit or manipulation on the part of the sender. In this situation, the receiver must be able to anticipate the interests of the sender and act appropriately to a given signal. Should any side gain advantage in the short term, evolution would select against the signal or the response. The conflict of interests between the sender and the receiver results in an evolutionarily stable state only if both sides can derive an overall benefit.

Although the potential benefits of deceit could be great in terms of mating success, there are several possibilities for how dishonesty is controlled, which include indices, handicaps, and common interests. Indices are reliable indicators of a desirable quality, such as overall health, fertility, or fighting ability of the organism. Handicaps, as the term suggests, place a restrictive cost on the organisms that own them, and thus lower quality competitors experience a greater relative cost compared to their higher quality counterparts. In the common interest situation, it is beneficial to both sender and receiver to communicate honestly such that the benefit of the interaction is maximized.

Signals are often honest, but there are exceptions. Prime examples of dishonest signals include the luminescent lure of the anglerfish, which is used to attract prey, or the mimicry of non-poisonous butterfly species, like the Batesian mimic Papilio polyxenes of the poisonous model Battus philenor. Although evolution should normally favor selection against the dishonest signal, in these cases it appears that the receiver would benefit more on average by accepting the signal.

== See also ==
- Autonomous foraging
- Behavioral plasticity
- Evolutionary models of food sharing
- Gene-centered view of evolution
- Human behavioral ecology
- Life history theory
- Marginal value theorem
- Optimization
  - Mating effort
  - Parental effort
- Phylogenetic comparative methods
- Selection
  - Balancing selection
  - Directional selection
  - Disruptive selection
  - Stabilizing selection
  - r/K selection theory
- Somatic effort
