= Sperm precedence =

Factor in sperm competition

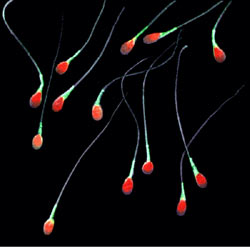
False color image of sperm

Sperm precedence is the tendency of a female who has bred with multiple males to produce the offspring of those males in unequal proportions. It thus only occurs in species breeding through sexual reproduction and with gametes of different sizes (anisogamy), which the majority of sexually reproducing species have.

Not all sexually reproducing species with anisogamy exhibit multiple mating by males with each reproductive female, so it has not been identified in all sexually reproducing species. Nevertheless, anisogamy leads to sperm competition and sperm selection, aspects of sexual selection, so sperm precedence is an important factor in the occurrence of postcopulatory sexual selection in species with such behaviour.

== Sperm competition ==
=== Why sperm competition? ===
Sperm competition occurs in sexually reproducing species that have unequally sized gametes, that is they exhibit anisogamy. But why should gametes be of different sizes?

There have been a number of suggestions of why this occurs in many species, but one relates to the advantage that a sex producing smaller microgamates (sperm) has in attempts at fertilisation of macrogametes (ova). Because macrogametes are much more costly to produce the sex producing them cannot keep up with the number of microgametes produced by the other sex.

Thus if selection starts on the gametes of one sex in a sexually reproducing species with equally sized gametes (isogamy), selection towards smaller gametes is likely to be successful. This cannot continue indefinitely, because microgametes must carry the genetic material of one sex, and must contain organelles to make them motile towards macrogames and to enable them to fuse with a macrogamete to form a zygote.

=== What is sperm competition? ===
In anisogamous species, because one sex produces many more microgametes than the other does macrogametes, microgametes (sperm) compete with each other for successful fertisation of each ova. (Note: The term ova is used here rather than egg because egg has multiple usages.) This occurs irrespective of the mating behaviour of the males producing the sperm.

However where male-female mating behaviour involves competition by males for access to females, then sperm competition can become more complex.

=== When does sperm precedence occur? ===
Sperm precedence requires the same conditions as sperm competition and sperm selection. But they (Note: Sperm competition and sperm selection.) cannot be identified in all species where these have been identified, because it requires example species where:

- Females normally mate with multiple males.
- It is ethically sound to investigate the progress of sperm from multiple males in fertilising each female.
- It is ethically sound to reproduce this investigation across replicates of females.

It is thus not surpring that sperm precedence or sperm selection have been identified in fewer groups of organisms, typically invertebrates, than sperm competition. (See Table 6.2 for examples of taxa where sperm competition has been identified.) Nevertheless, if these conditions can be satisfied, then sperm precedence can be investigated.

== Examples of sperm precedence ==
Sperm precedence has been identified in diverse groups of animals where females mate with multiple males. Examples are given in the table below. It is not surprising that many are found in insects, the most diverse group of Arthropoda and far more diverse (that is, including far more species) than the whole of vertebrates, the group containing mammals. Another group where examples are found are arachnids, including many spiders.

Birds are a group of vertebrates where some species are bred domestically, and the example given here is a species, the Japanese quail, studied to improve breeding success. The discovery of sperm precdence was not the main focus.

The only mammalian example is the house mouse because it has been bred for experimental work (the laboratory mouse) and thus can satisfy ethical requirements for lab work on mammals.

Sperm precedence in animals
Group (Note: Not all taxonmic groups are equivalent.)	Species	Common name
Insects	Panorpa germanica L.	German scorpionfly
Insects	Anthidium manicatum	European wool carder bee
Insects	Tenebrio molitor L.	Yellow mealworm beetle
Insects	Callosobruchus maculatus	Cowpea seed beetle
Insects	Eriopis connexa (Germar)	Ladybird beetle
Insects	Harmonia axyridis (Pallas)	Harlequin, Asian or multicoloured Asian ladybird beetle
Insects	Drosophila melanogaster	Fruit fly
Insects	Apis mellifera	Western honey bee
Insects	Ephestia kuehniella	Mediterranean flour moth
Insects	Dryomyza anilis	Fly (Note: No other details of common name.)
Insects	Scathophaga stercoraria L.	Yellow dung fly
Insects	Tribolium castaneum (Herbst)	Red flour beetle
Arachnids	Misumena vatia	Goldenrod crab spider or flower crab spider
Arachnids	Pisaura mirabilis	Predatory spider, cunning spider or bridal gift spider
Birds	Coturnix japonica	Japanese quail or cotornix quail
Mammals	Mus musculus	House mouse (Note: The house mouse bred for laboratory research.)

== Types of sperm precedence ==
The most frequently found types of sperm precedence are temporal, that is relating to the order in which a male mates with a female in a sequence of matings. If the first male to mate is likely to have an advantage, then sperm precedence is described as first male precedence. If the last male to mate is likely to have an advantage, then sperm precedence is described as last male precedence.

Other types of sperm precedence have been suggested. Sperm precedence can favor the male whose sperm are the most motile, or the male whose sperm were delivered closest to the female's ova.

The species where sperm precedence has been identified in the table shown in Examples of sperm precedence above give indication of where the different types of sperm precedence occur.

=== Species exhibiting different types of sperm precedence ===
Many insects exhibit last male precedence. This includes Anthidium manicatum the European wool carder bee, although the authors of the research on this species also write: "Or at least 'late' male precedence". This suggests some change in advantage in the sperm precedence of later males.

Of those insect species given in the table above the two ladybird beetle species Eriopis connexa and Harmonia axyridis are the exceptions. Eriopis connexa is included because it is a species where males and females mate multiple times with each other and the reference provided was a search for sperm precedence. However, no consistent trend for sperm precedence was found. Harmonia axyridis, in contrast to most other insect species, exhibits first male precedence.

The two spider species given, also invertbrates, but part of Arachnida rather than Arthropoda the group to which insects belong, both exhibit first male precedence.

The house mouse example is unusual. The only reason it can be included is that it has been bred for laboratory work and thus satisfies ethical standards. Researchers in the study given suggested that last male precedence could be found in breeding among certain haplotypes distinct from the wildtype.

=== Mechanisms for sperm precedence ===
As already mentioned, many insect species exhibit last male precedence. But one of the insect species considered here exhibits first male precedence.

Either of these phenomena may be a consequence of the reproductive anatomy of insects. Female insects (and females of some other groups) have spermathecae, organs that can receive and store sperm from males following mating. Thus, the existence of spermathecae means that sperm do not travel directly to ova during reproduction and sperm competition between early- or late-mating males may be controlled by female behaviour.

Mating plugs formed within the female reproductive tract can have a role in sperm storage, but also in female remating, and thus support first male precedence.

Mating of females with multiple males can enable sperm displacement. An early example of this was identified in dung flies, supporting last male precedence. Later models confirmed how this form of mating behaviour including sperm displacement could result in last male precendence.

What this observation of behaviour combined with modelling could not do was confirm the movement of the copulating male's ejaculate through the female's reproductive tract. A technique to monitor this added a final piece of evidence. Different males were labelled with different radioisotopes, allowing their sperm to be tracked in the female reproductive tract.

The use of radioisotopes confirmed last male precedence in the yellow dung fly, but through an indirect rather than direct process of sperm displacement. Male yellow dung flies copulate into an organ of the female reproductive system called the bursa copulatrix. Sperm received there are transferred into the female's spermathacae. Each female has three spermathacae, where sperm can be stored for some time before being used for fertilization. As a consequence the bursa copulatrix may be a location for sperm displacement, but sperm dispacement in the spermathacae is needed to result in sperm precedence during multiple mating.
