= Environment of Argentina =

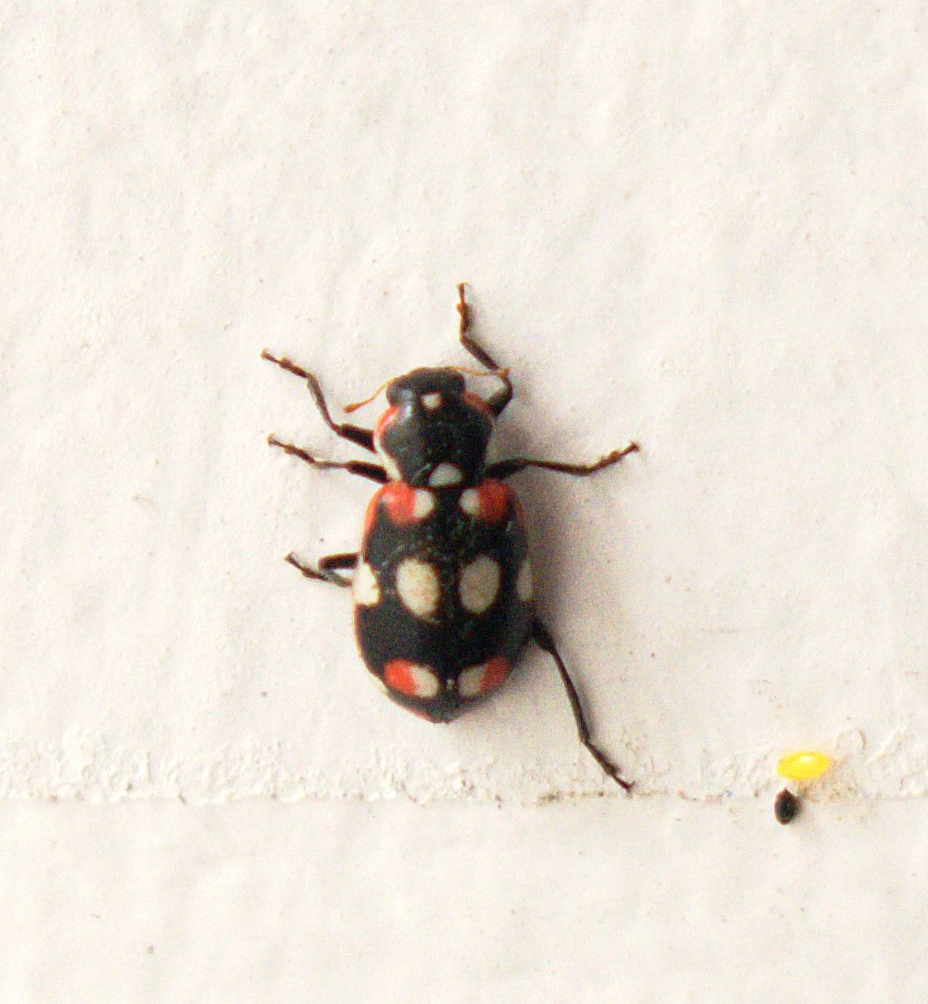
Eriopis connexa is found in Argentina

The environment of Argentina is highly biodiverse.

== Biodiversity ==
=== Flora ===
Subtropical plants dominate the Gran Chaco in the north, with the Dalbergia genus of trees well represented by Brazilian rosewood and the quebracho tree; also predominant are the wacho white and black algarrobo trees (Prosopis alba and Prosopis nigra). Savannah-like areas exist in the drier regions nearer the Andes. Aquatic plants thrive in the wetlands of Argentina. In central Argentina the humid pampas are a true tallgrass prairie ecosystem.

In Argentina forest cover is around 10% of the total land area, equivalent to 28,573,000 hectares (ha) of forest in 2020, down from 35,204,000 ha in 1990. In 2020, naturally regenerating forest covered 27,137,000 ha and planted forest covered 1,436,000 ha. Of the naturally regenerating forest 0% was reported to be primary forest (consisting of native tree species with no clearly visible indications of human activity) and around 7% of the forest area was found within protected areas. For the year 2015, 0% of the forest area was reported to be under public ownership, 4% private ownership and 96% with ownership listed as other or unknown.

The original pampa had virtually no trees; some imported species like the American sycamore or eucalyptus are present along roads or in towns and country estates (estancias). The only tree-like plant native to the pampa is the evergreen ombú. The surface soils of the pampa are a deep black color, primarily mollisols, known commonly as humus. This makes the region one of the most agriculturally productive on Earth; however, this is also responsible for decimating much of the original ecosystem, to make way for commercial agriculture. The western pampas receive less rainfall, this dry pampa is a plain of short grasses or steppe.

Most of Patagonia lies within the rain shadow of the Andes, so the flora, shrubby bushes and plants, is suited to dry conditions. The soil is hard and rocky, making large-scale farming impossible except along river valleys. Coniferous forests in far western Patagonia and on the island of Tierra del Fuego, include alerce, ciprés de la cordillera, ciprés de las guaitecas, huililahuán, lleuque, mañío hembra and pehuén, while broadleaf trees include several species of Nothofagus such as coihue, lenga and ñire. Other introduced trees present in forestry plantations include spruce, cypress and pine. Common plants are the copihue and colihue.

In Cuyo, semiarid thorny bushes and other xerophile plants abound. Along the many rivers grasses and trees grow in significant numbers. The area presents optimal conditions for the large scale growth of grape vines. In northwest Argentina there are many species of cactus. No vegetation grows in the highest elevations (above 4,000 m (13,000 ft)) because of the extreme altitude.

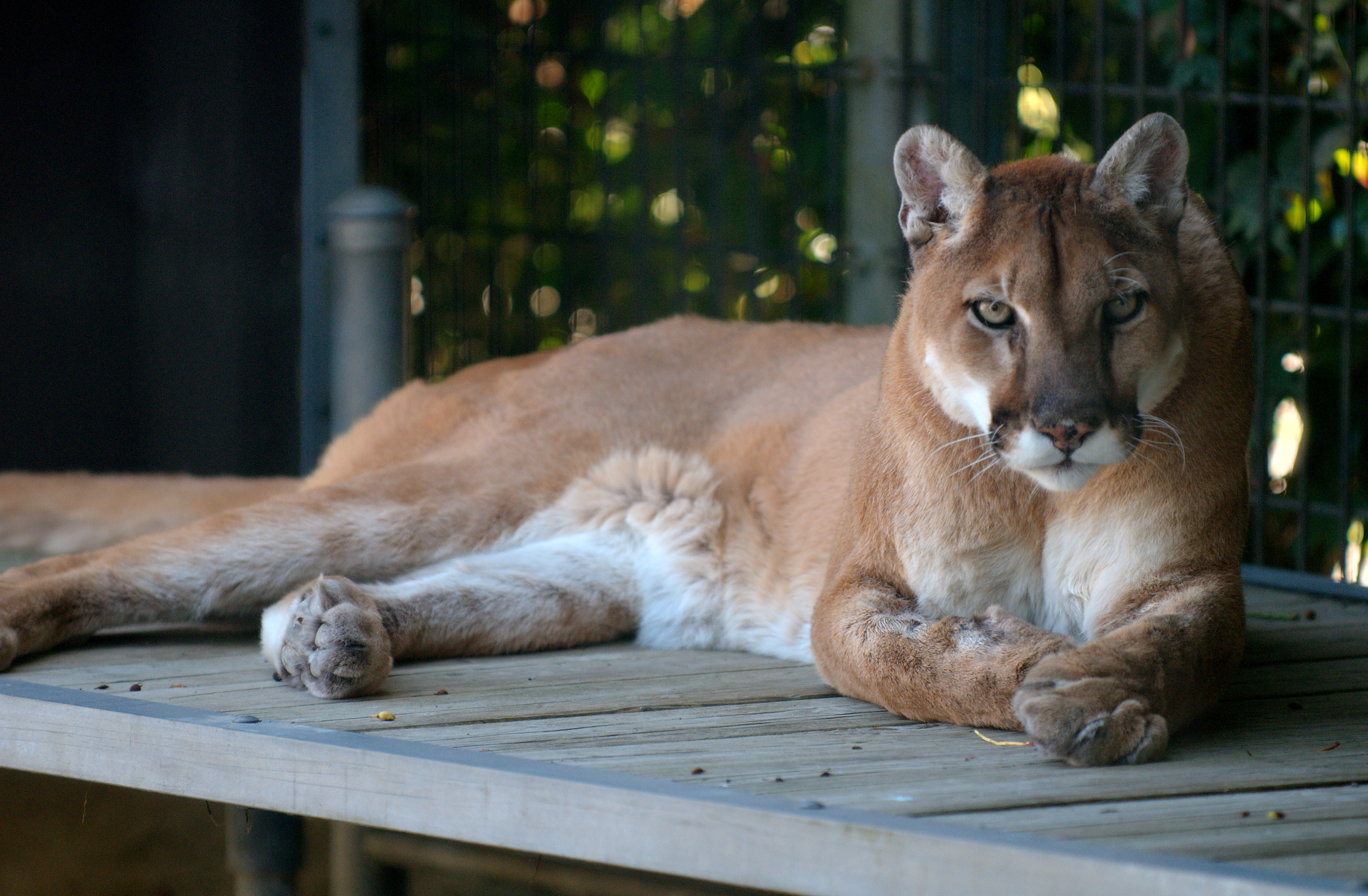
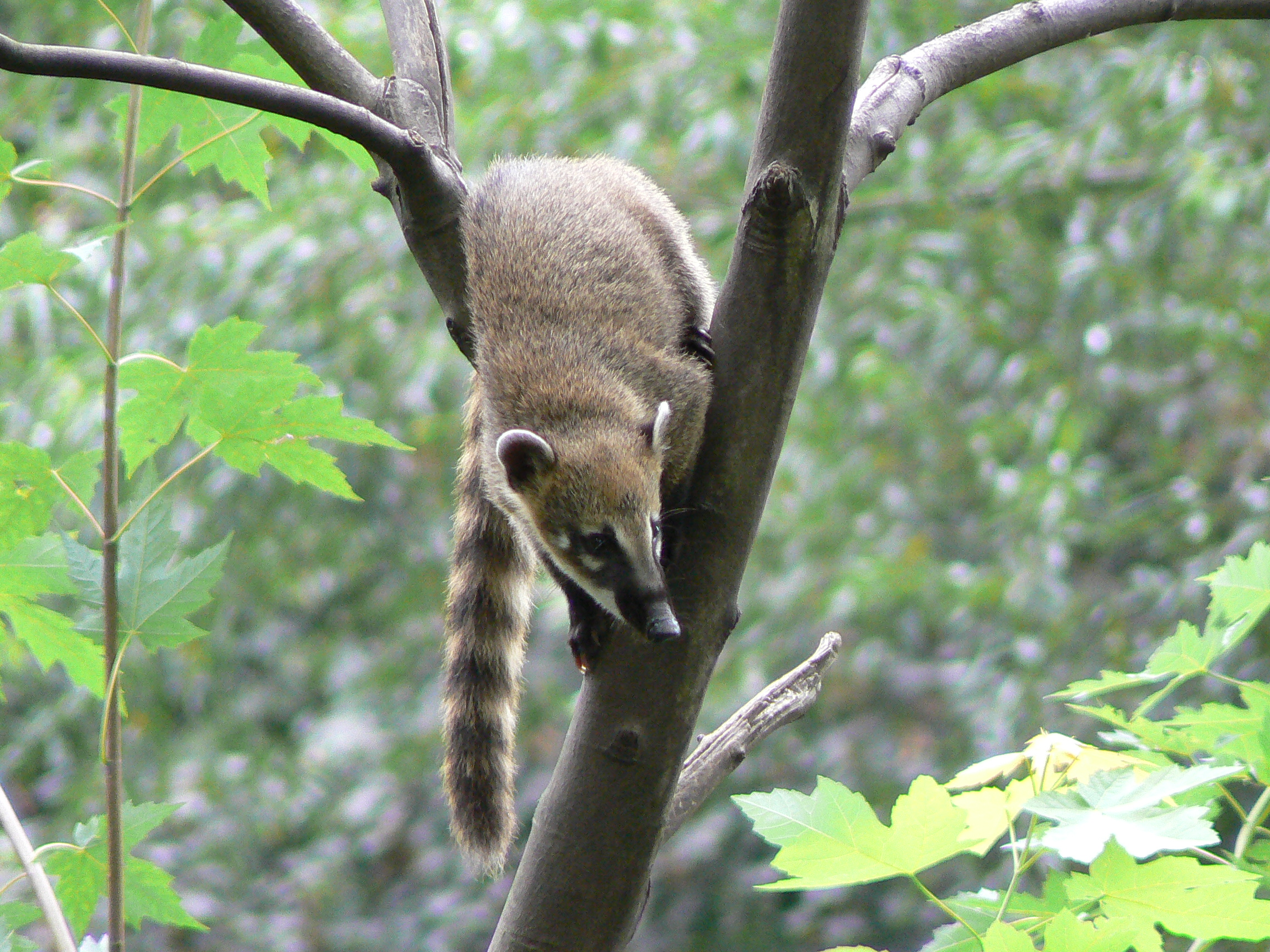
A puma (Northwest) and a coati (Mesopotamic Region).

=== Fauna ===
Many species live in the subtropical north. Prominent animals include big cats like the jaguar and puma; primates (howler monkey); large reptiles (crocodiles), the Argentine black and white tegu and a species of caiman. Other animals include the tapir, peccary, capybara, bush dog, and various species of turtle and tortoise. There are a wide variety of birds, notably hummingbirds, flamingos, toucans, and swallows.

The central grasslands are populated by the giant anteater, armadillo, pampas cat, maned wolf, mara, cavias, and the rhea (ñandú), a large flightless bird. Hawks, falcons, herons, and tinamous (perdiz, Argentine "false partridges") inhabit the region. There are also pampas deer and pampas foxes. Some of these species extend into Patagonia.

The western mountains are home to animals including the llama, guanaco and vicuña which are among the most recognizable species of South America. Also in this region are the fox, viscacha, Andean mountain cat, kodkod, and the largest flying bird in the New World, the Andean condor.

Southern Argentina is home to the cougar, huemul, pudú (the world's smallest deer), and introduced, non-native wild boar. The coast of Patagonia is rich in animal life: elephant seals, fur seals, sea lions and species of penguin. The far south is populated by cormorants.

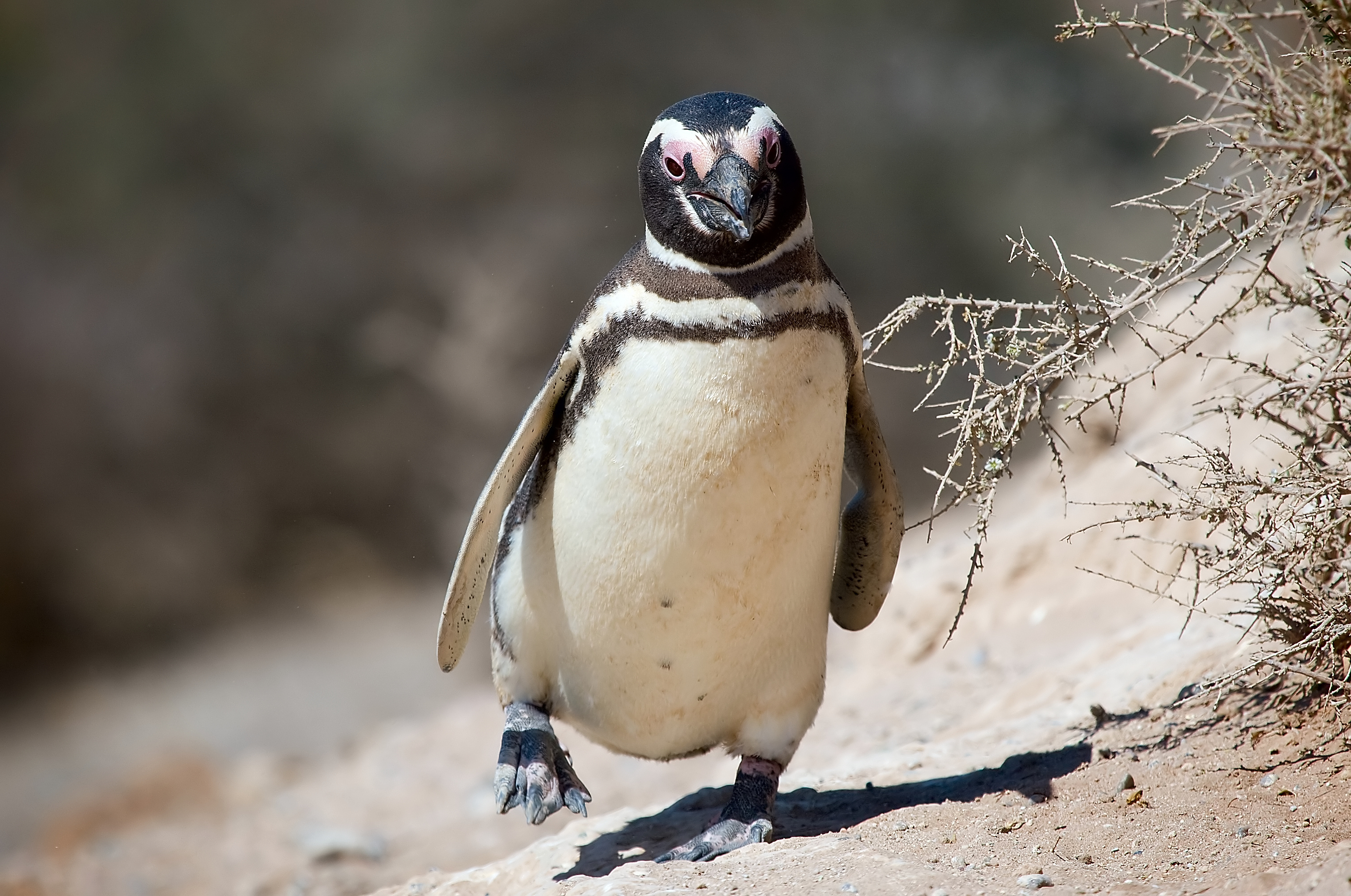
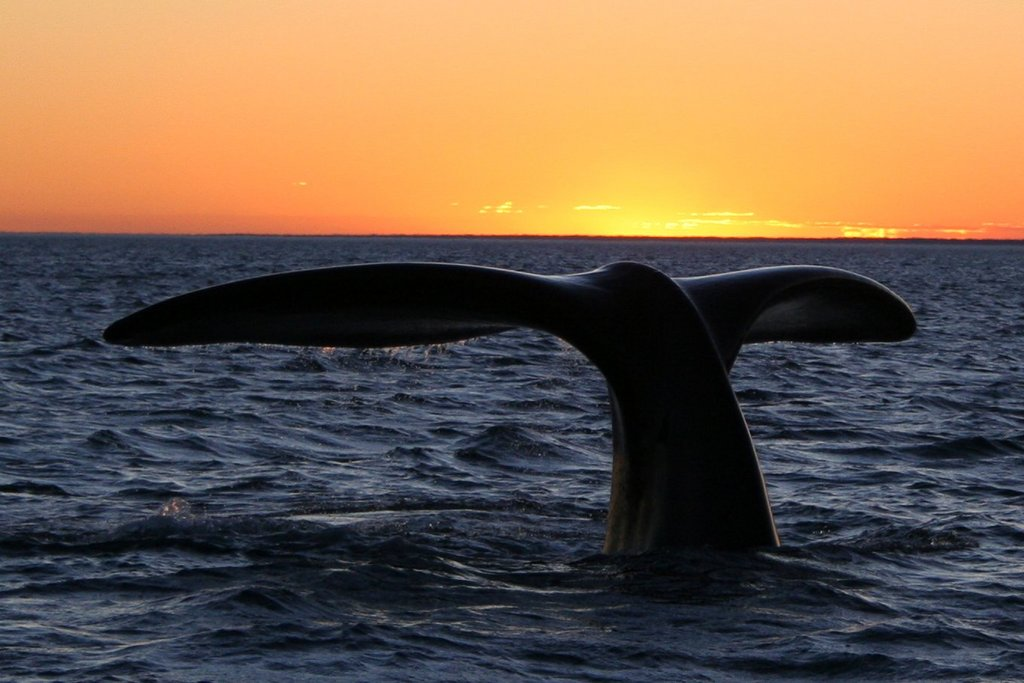
A Magellanic penguin (Patagonic Region) and a southern right whale (Patagonia).

The territorial waters of Argentina have abundant ocean life. There are mammals such as dolphins, orcas, and whales, like the southern right whale, which is a major tourist draw. Sea fish include sardines, Argentine hakes, dolphinfish, salmon, and sharks; also present are squid and king crab (centolla) in Tierra del Fuego. Rivers and streams in Argentina have many species of trout and the South American golden dorado. Well known snake species inhabiting Argentina include boa constrictors and a very venomous pit viper named the yarará. The hornero was elected the national bird after a survey in 1928.

Insects, like Eriopis connexa are found throughout the country.

== Environmental issues ==
The largest fresh-water oil spill was caused by the Estrella Pampeana, a Shell Petroleum tanker in the Río de la Plata, off Magdalena, on January 15, 1999, polluting the environment, drinking water, and local wildlife.

Argentina had a 2018 Forest Landscape Integrity Index mean score of 7.21/10, ranking it 47th globally out of 172 countries.

In 2025, the Supreme Court of Justice adopted a historic decision against oil pollution in Calilegua, ordering the immediate cessation of exploitation of the Caimancito oilfield and establishing an environmental restoration plan with a deadline in 2030. The case was promoted by a group of residents of Calilegua National Park. Already in 2021, the Supreme Court ordered to stop hydrocarbon exploitation there. When voting, Judge Lorenzetti emphasized that environmental protection must prevail as demanded by Law 22,351, and the welfare of future generations.

== See also ==
- List of birds of Argentina
- Protected areas of Argentina
