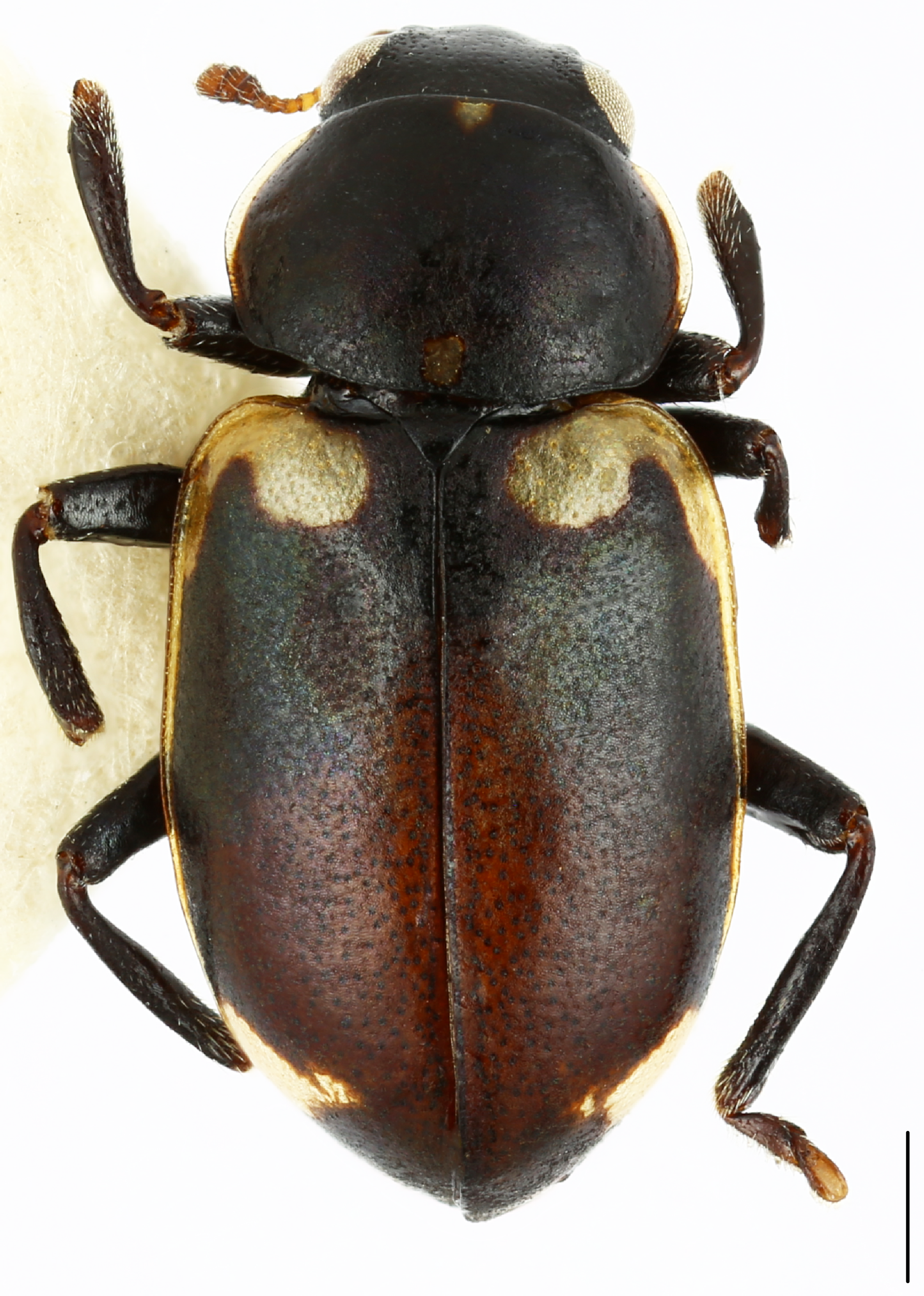

Scientific classification
- Kingdom: Animalia
- Phylum: Arthropoda
- Clade: Pancrustacea
- Class: Insecta
- Order: Coleoptera
- Suborder: Polyphaga
- Infraorder: Cucujiformia
- Family: Coccinellidae
- Genus: Eriopis
- Species: E. patagonia

Binomial name
- Eriopis patagonia Salazar, 2020

= Eriopis patagonia =

Species of South American beetle

Eriopis patagonia is a species of ladybird beetle that is native to Patagonia, South America.

It was first described by Colombian entomologist Karen Salazar in 2020, following DNA analysis of two museum specimens from the French National Museum of Natural History (Muséum national d'Histoire naturelle), collected in Patagonia 100 years ago. Its DNA was sequenced using Next-Generation Sequencing (NGS) to reconstruct its mitochondrial genome, which helped determine its phylogenetic position within the Coccinellidae, showing that Eriopis is a sister group to Cycloneda.
