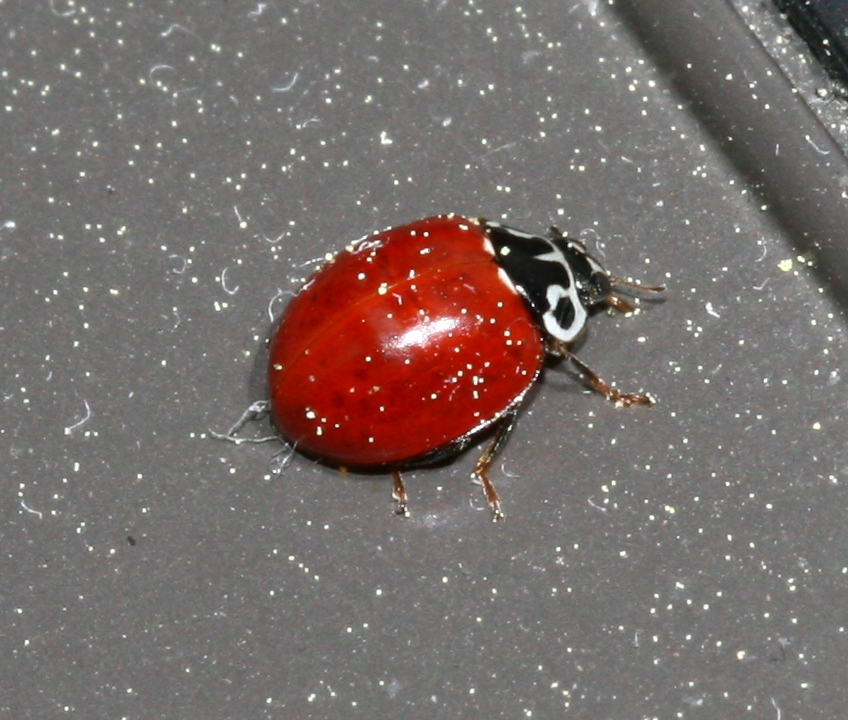

Scientific classification
- Kingdom: Animalia
- Phylum: Arthropoda
- Clade: Pancrustacea
- Class: Insecta
- Order: Coleoptera
- Suborder: Polyphaga
- Infraorder: Cucujiformia
- Family: Coccinellidae
- Genus: Cycloneda
- Species: C. polita

Binomial name
- Cycloneda polita Casey, 1899

= Cycloneda polita =

Species of beetle

Cycloneda polita, known generally as the western blood-red lady beetle, polished ladybug, or western spotless ladybird beetle, is a species of lady beetle in the family Coccinellidae. It is found in North America. It has red elytra without spots and a black thorax marked with a white rim and crescents.

A western polished lady beetle and her eggs near a milkweed aphid colony

Female western polished lady beetle, eggs maturing, and emerging first instar larvae on narrow-leaf milkweed

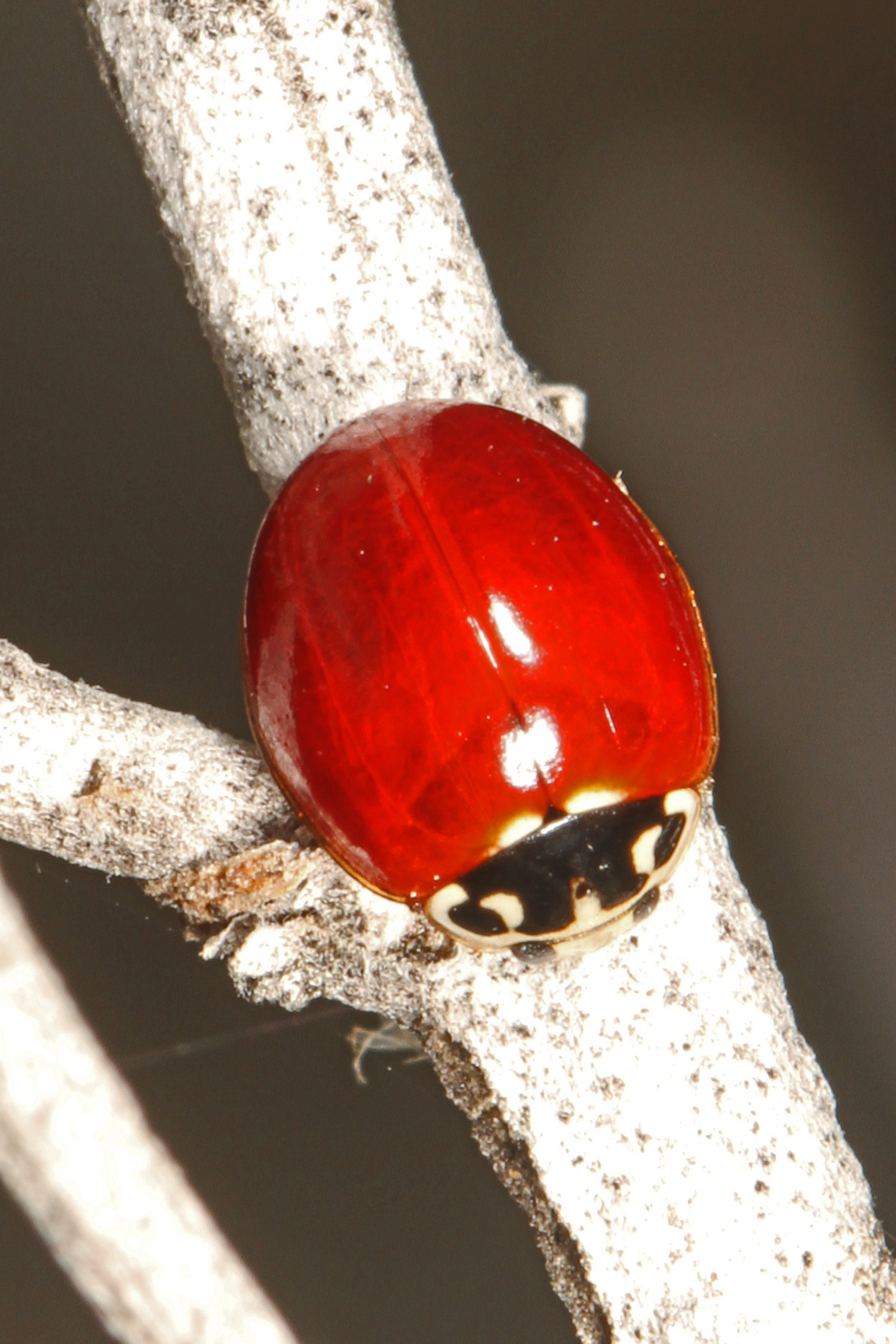
Western blood-red lady beetle, Cycloneda polita
