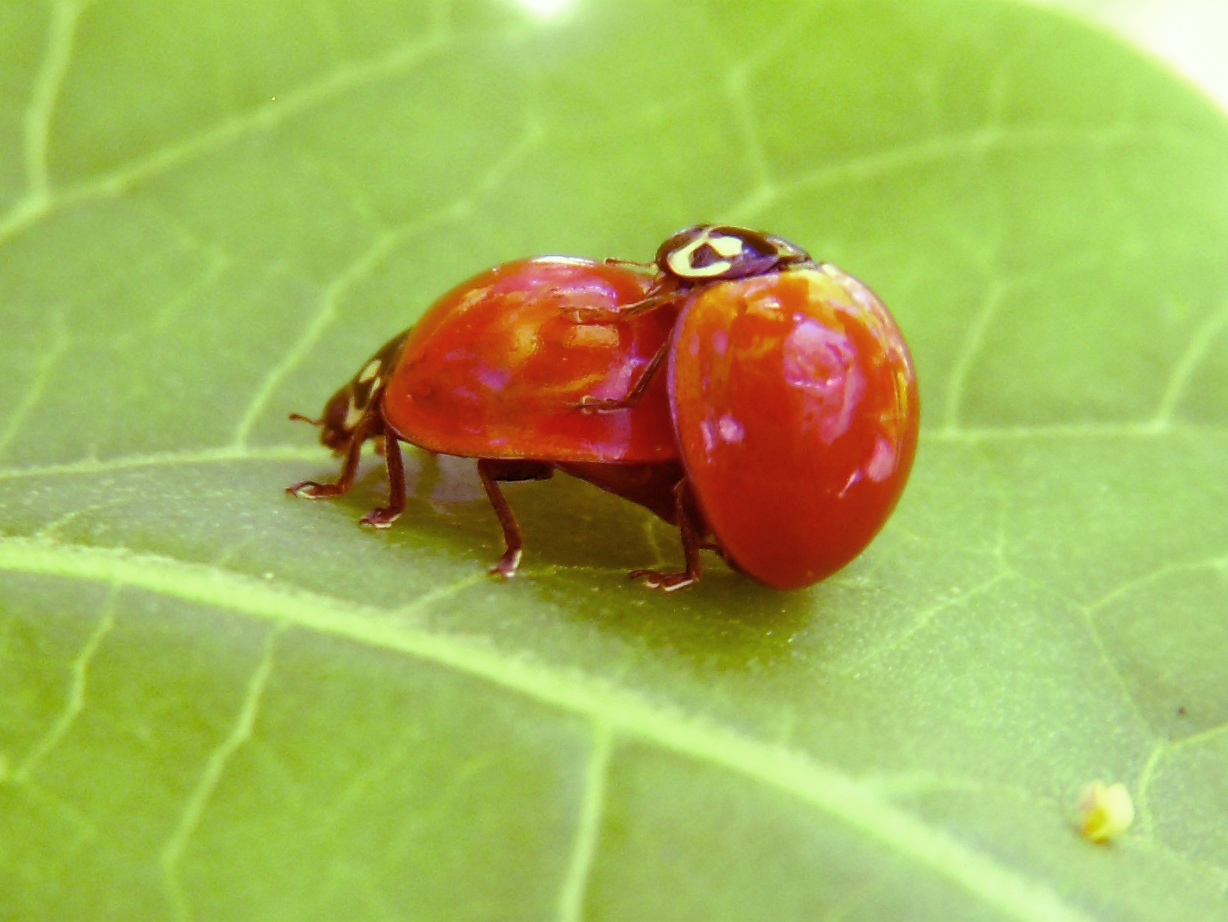
- Mating pair

Scientific classification
- Kingdom: Animalia
- Phylum: Arthropoda
- Clade: Pancrustacea
- Class: Insecta
- Order: Coleoptera
- Suborder: Polyphaga
- Infraorder: Cucujiformia
- Family: Coccinellidae
- Genus: Cycloneda
- Species: C. sanguinea

Binomial name
- Cycloneda sanguinea (Linnaeus, 1763)

Synonyms
- Coccinella sanguinea Linnaeus, 1763; Coccinella immaculata Fabricius, 1792; Coccinella polonica Hampe, 1850; Coccinella reflexa Germain, 1854; Coccinella varians Germain, 1854; Daulis steini Mulsant, 1866; Cycloneda hondurasica Casey, 1899; Cycloneda limbifer Casey, 1899; Cycloneda rubripennis Casey, 1899

= Cycloneda sanguinea =

Species of beetle

Cycloneda sanguinea, also known as the spotless lady beetle, is a widespread species of ladybird beetle in the Americas.

== Distribution ==
Cycloneda sanguinea is the most widespread ladybird beetle in Latin America, typically found in plant-dense landscapes ranging from the southern United States to Argentina, and eastward to the Cayman Islands. There are several species of ladybeetle that look similar to the spotless ladybeetle. On the Galápagos Islands, it lives in sympatry with its sister species, Cycloneda galapagensis.

== Description ==
Cycloneda sanguinea is a large ladybird beetle with red, unspotted elytra (wing covers) ranging from 4-6.5 mm long. The color ranges from orange to deep red. The white and black marks on the head and pronotum are very distinctive, and are gender-specific. Females and males both have white spots on the black part, but the female has black in the center, continuing down into the face, while the male has a white cleft above the head and a white face. These ladybugs are often found feeding on aphids on milkweeds, but also occur on a number of other plants.

Their eggs are typically orange or yellow, and around 1 mm in diameter. The larvae are larger, taking on a black color with yellow markings ranging up to 6 mm long. The pupae are a pale color that eventually turns brown or orange, and the pupae have the remarkable ability to "bite" potential predators using a device known as a "gin trap".

== Biological control ==
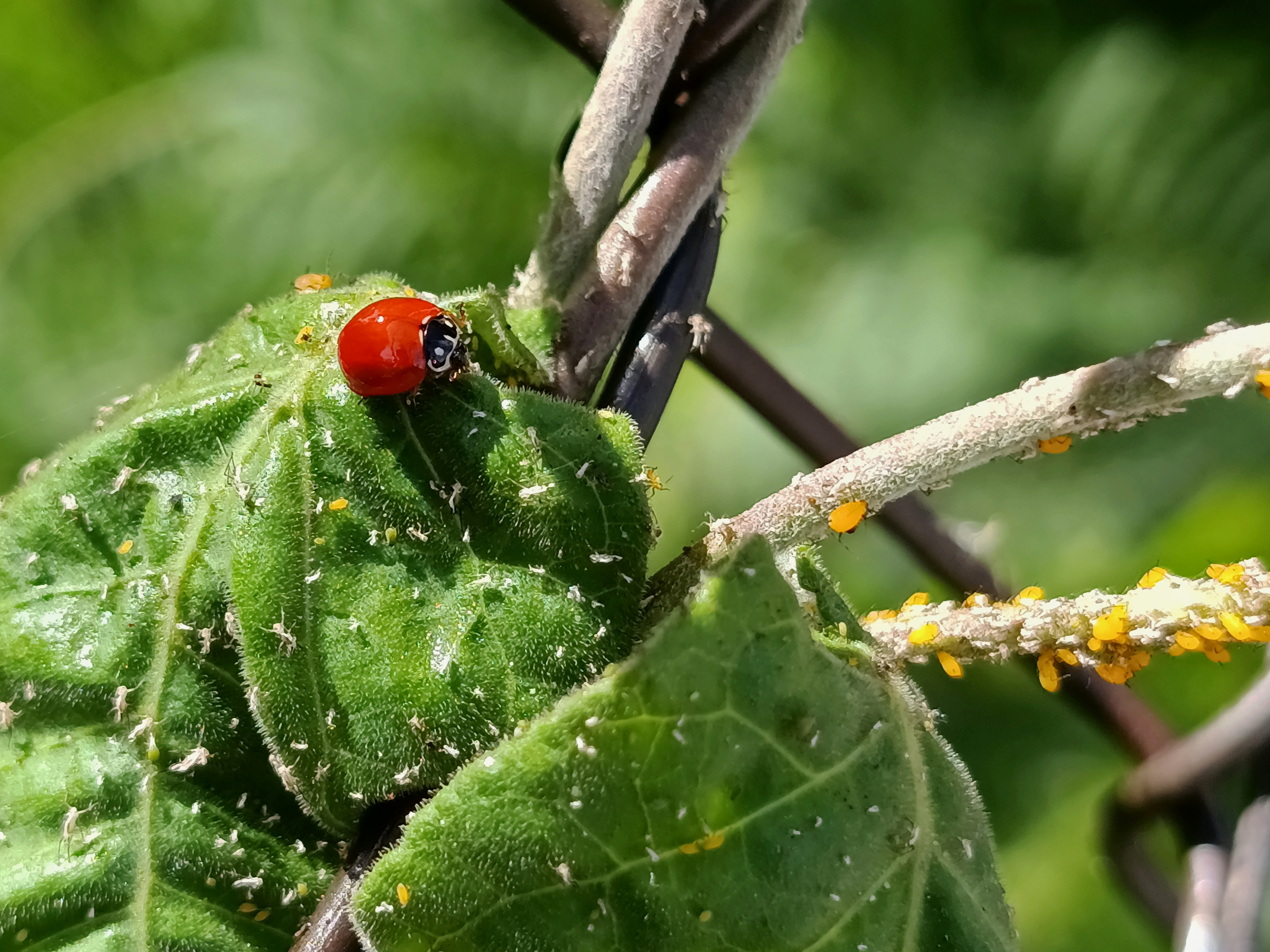
C. sanguinea eating oleander aphids.

Spotless ladybeetles typically share the same habitats with many aphids that damage crops and other plants. Spotless ladybeetles feed on these aphids, making them a prime candidate for use in natural biological control. However, the use of the ladybeetle is not necessarily a foolproof plan for protecting crops. The analysis of the consumption of Toxoptera citricida by the spotless ladybeetle found that the consumption of this aphid significantly hinders the development of C. sanguinea larvae, completely killing the larvae after its third development stage. The study proves that some aphids are toxic to the spotless ladybeetle, rendering them useless in some aspects of natural biological control.

There have been several investigations into ways of improving biological control by using other means in unison with spotless lady beetles. These include reducing the amount of dust on plant leaves, introducing "control ants" to feed on the aphids, and growing flowering plants that attract other natural predators of the aphids.

The use of neem seed oil has been investigated as a potential natural pesticide to enhance biological control alongside spotless lady beetles. A study conducted in 2004 by Neotropical Entomology investigated the effects on the ladybeetle when the eggs, larvae, and adults were directly sprayed with neem seed oil. Overall, the study found that lower concentrations of oil did not affect the mortality rate of the spotless ladybeetle at any stage, while a higher concentration of 5 milliliters of oil per 1 liter of water only saw significantly higher mortality rates in larvae. With little effect on the survivorship and overall fitness of Cycloneda sanguinea, neem seed oil seems to be a promising natural alternative pesticide.

== The gin trap ==
The Cycloneda sanguinea pupae have four clefts on their abdomen that make up the gin trap. The trap is open when the pupa is at rest, and is triggered by a reflex which flexes the abdomen, shutting the clefts and resulting in a snapping-like motion that is quick to return to its original resting position. This mechanism is used to protect the pupae from predators. It was found that when introduced to predators in a controlled environment (in particular Solenopsis invicta, worker fire ants) it was found that the straightening reflex causes the pupa to take more of an upright stance momentarily as the clefts pinch closed. This can also be seen by scraping the gin trap with a bristle of brush. Despite the gin trap shared by other species in the family, not much research has been conducted on its development and the control of the mechanism.

== Population trends ==
Cycloneda sanguinea is a relatively dominant and widespread predator. However, in some areas, its population has been on the decline due to the introduction of another ladybeetle species. The Asian ladybeetle species Harmonia axyridis was introduced to the United States in hopes of controlling pests like the red pine bast scale. With their introduction, they began to invade other ladybeetle habitats. A particular analysis looked at the relative abundance of the spotless ladybeetle in Florida alongside Harmonia axyridis. It found that the significant decrease in the population can be attributed to many intrinsic advantages that Harmonia axyridis has over the spotless ladybeetle, such as higher body mass, higher food demand, higher numbers of eggs laid, and lower frequencies of larval cannibalism.
