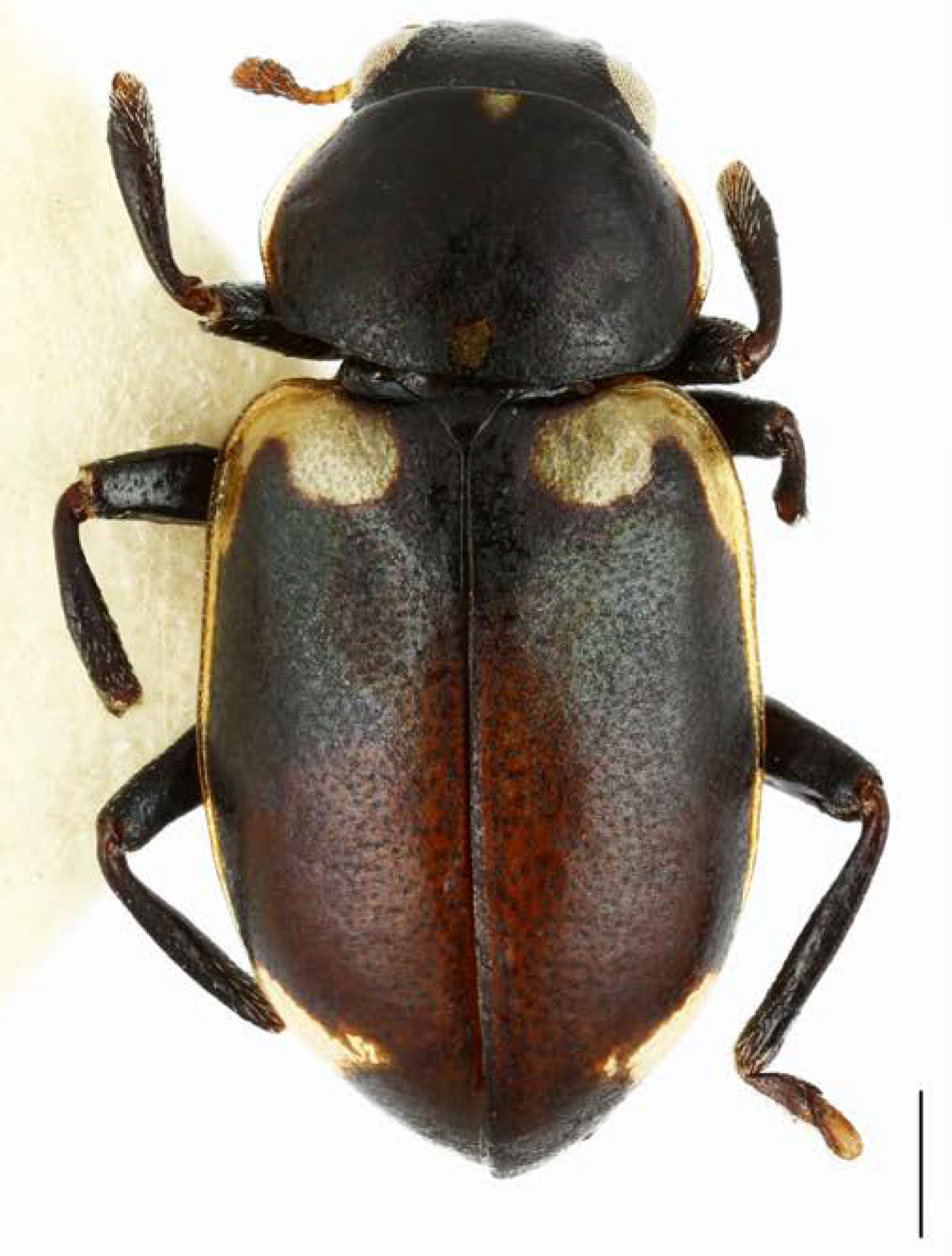
- Eriopis patagonia

Scientific classification
- Kingdom: Animalia
- Phylum: Arthropoda
- Clade: Pancrustacea
- Class: Insecta
- Order: Coleoptera
- Suborder: Polyphaga
- Infraorder: Cucujiformia
- Family: Coccinellidae
- Subfamily: Coccinellinae
- Tribe: Coccinellini
- Genus: Eriopis; Mulsant, 1850

= Eriopis (beetle) =

Genus of beetles

Eriopis is a genus of lady beetles in the family Coccinellidae. There are about 20 described species in Eriopis.

== Species ==
These 20 species belong to the genus Eriopis:

- Eriopis alticola Hofmann, 1970
- Eriopis andina Hofmann, 1970
- Eriopis canrash Bustamante, González & Oróz, 2007
- Eriopis chilensis Hofmann, 1970
- Eriopis churai González, 2018
- Eriopis connexa (Germar, 1824)
- Eriopis eschscholtzii Mulsant, 1850
- Eriopis figueroai González, 2018
- Eriopis huancavelicae Bustamante, Oróz & González, 2009
- Eriopis lawalawani Bustamante, González & Oróz, 2007
- Eriopis loaensis Gonzalez, 2014
- Eriopis magellanica (Philippi, 1862)
- Eriopis minima Hofmann, 1970
- Eriopis nobilis Mader, 1958
- Eriopis opposita (Guerin-Meneville, 1842)
- Eriopis patagonia Salazar, 2020
- Eriopis peruviana Hofmann, 1970
- Eriopis punicola Hofmann, 1970
- Eriopis santiagoi Bustamante-Navarrete & Oróz, 2016
- Eriopis sebastiani Bustamante, 2005
