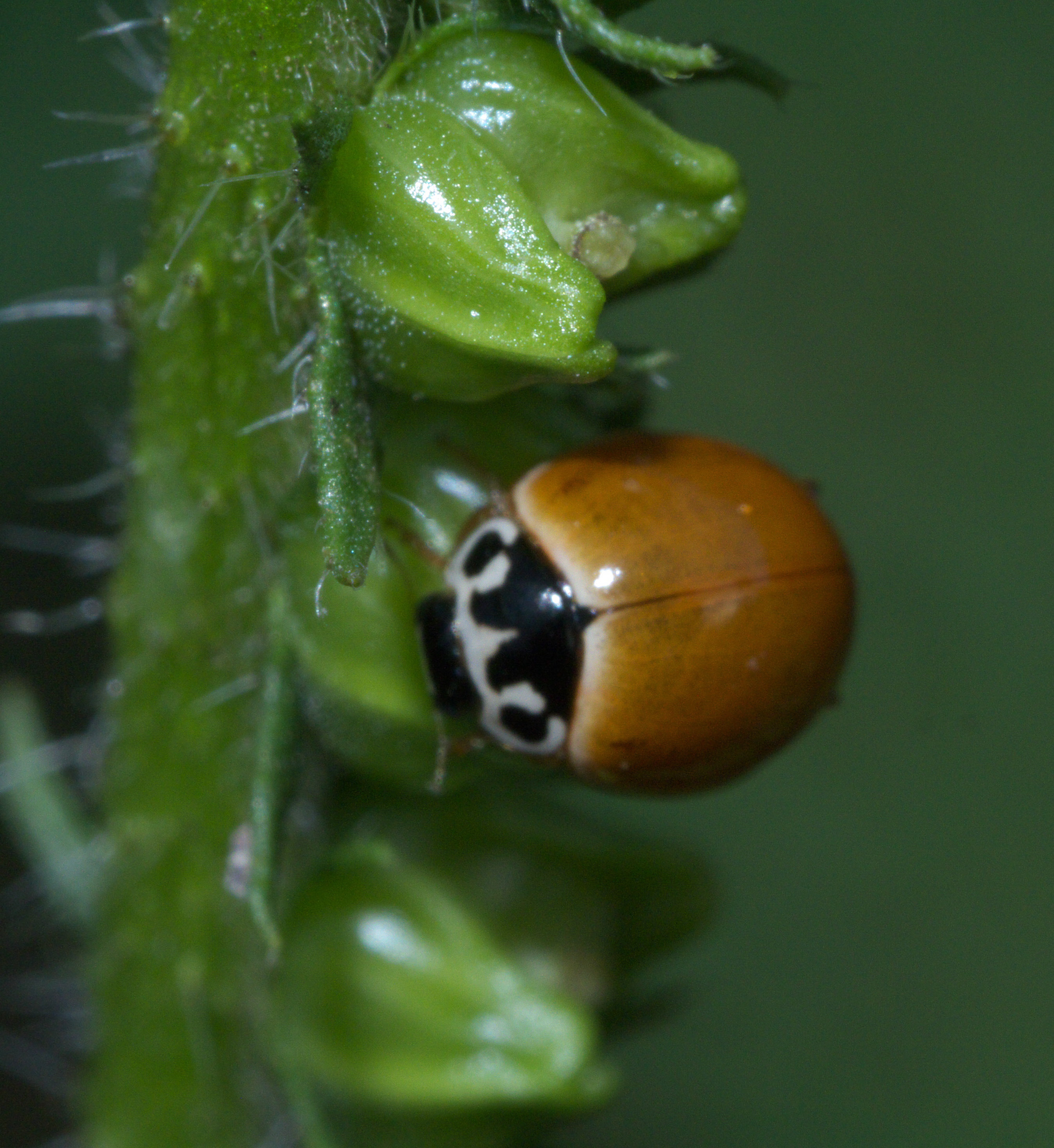

Scientific classification
- Kingdom: Animalia
- Phylum: Arthropoda
- Clade: Pancrustacea
- Class: Insecta
- Order: Coleoptera
- Suborder: Polyphaga
- Infraorder: Cucujiformia
- Family: Coccinellidae
- Genus: Cycloneda
- Species: C. munda

Binomial name
- Cycloneda munda (Say, 1835)

Synonyms
- Coccinella munda Say, 1835; Cycloneda atra Casey, 1899; Coccinella krikkeni Iablokoff-Khnzorian, 1982

= Cycloneda munda =

Species of beetle

Cycloneda munda, known generally as the polished lady beetle or immaculate ladybird beetle, is a species of lady beetle in the family Coccinellidae. It is found in Eastern North America.

== Description ==
Adults reach a length of about 3.7-5.7 mm. The pronotum is black with pale lateral spot. The elytron is reddish yellow.
