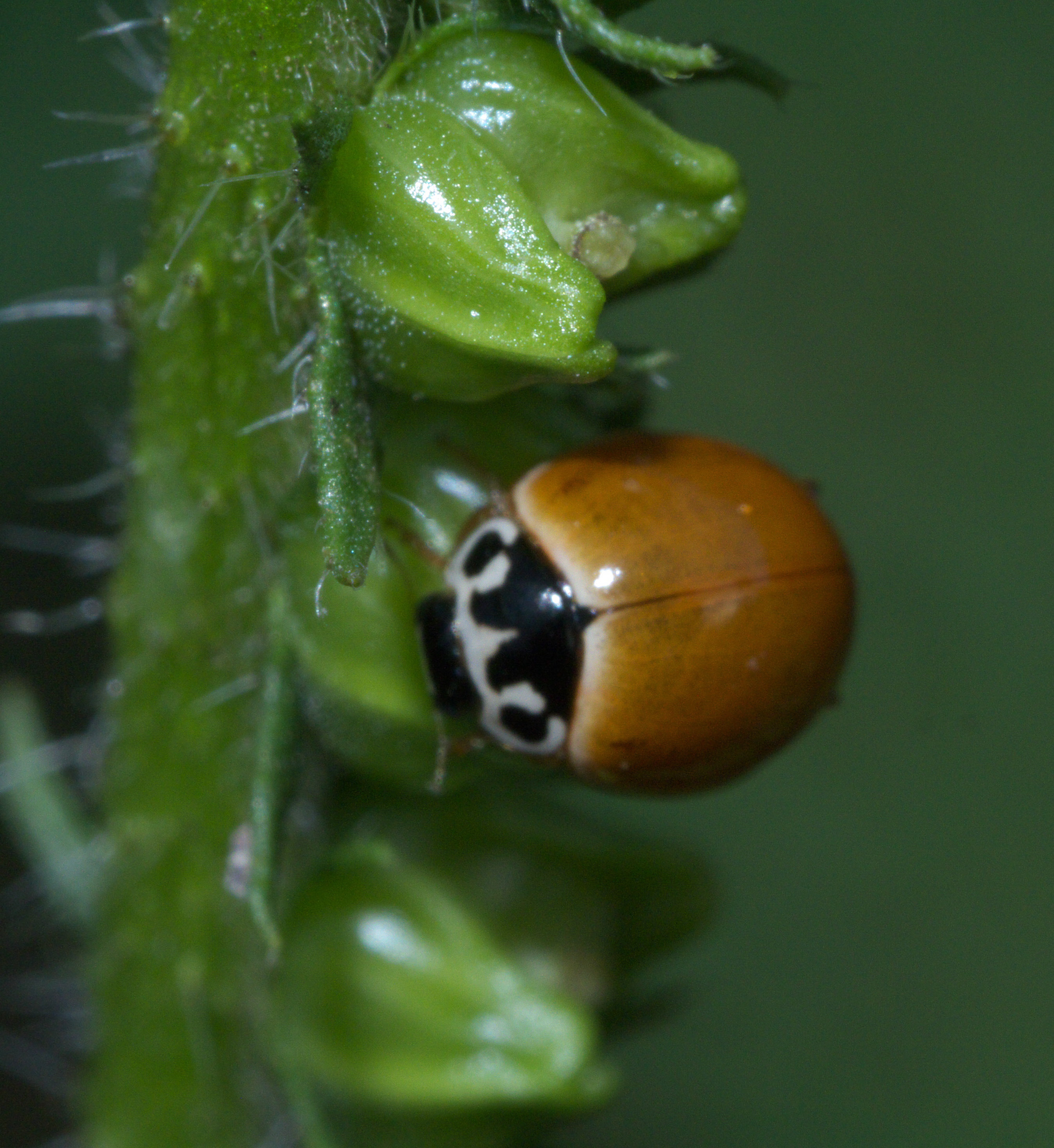
- Cycloneda munda

Scientific classification
- Kingdom: Animalia
- Phylum: Arthropoda
- Clade: Pancrustacea
- Class: Insecta
- Order: Coleoptera
- Suborder: Polyphaga
- Infraorder: Cucujiformia
- Family: Coccinellidae
- Tribe: Coccinellini
- Genus: Cycloneda; Crotch, 1871

Synonyms
- Daulis Mulsant, 1850; Coccinellina Timberlake, 1943; Pseudadonia Timberlake, 1943

= Cycloneda =

Genus of beetles

Cycloneda is a genus of spotless lady beetles in the family Coccinellidae. There are more than 20 described species in Cycloneda.

A western polished lady beetle and her eggs near a milkweed aphid colony

Female western polished lady beetle, eggs maturing, and emerging first instar larvae on narrow-leaf milkweed

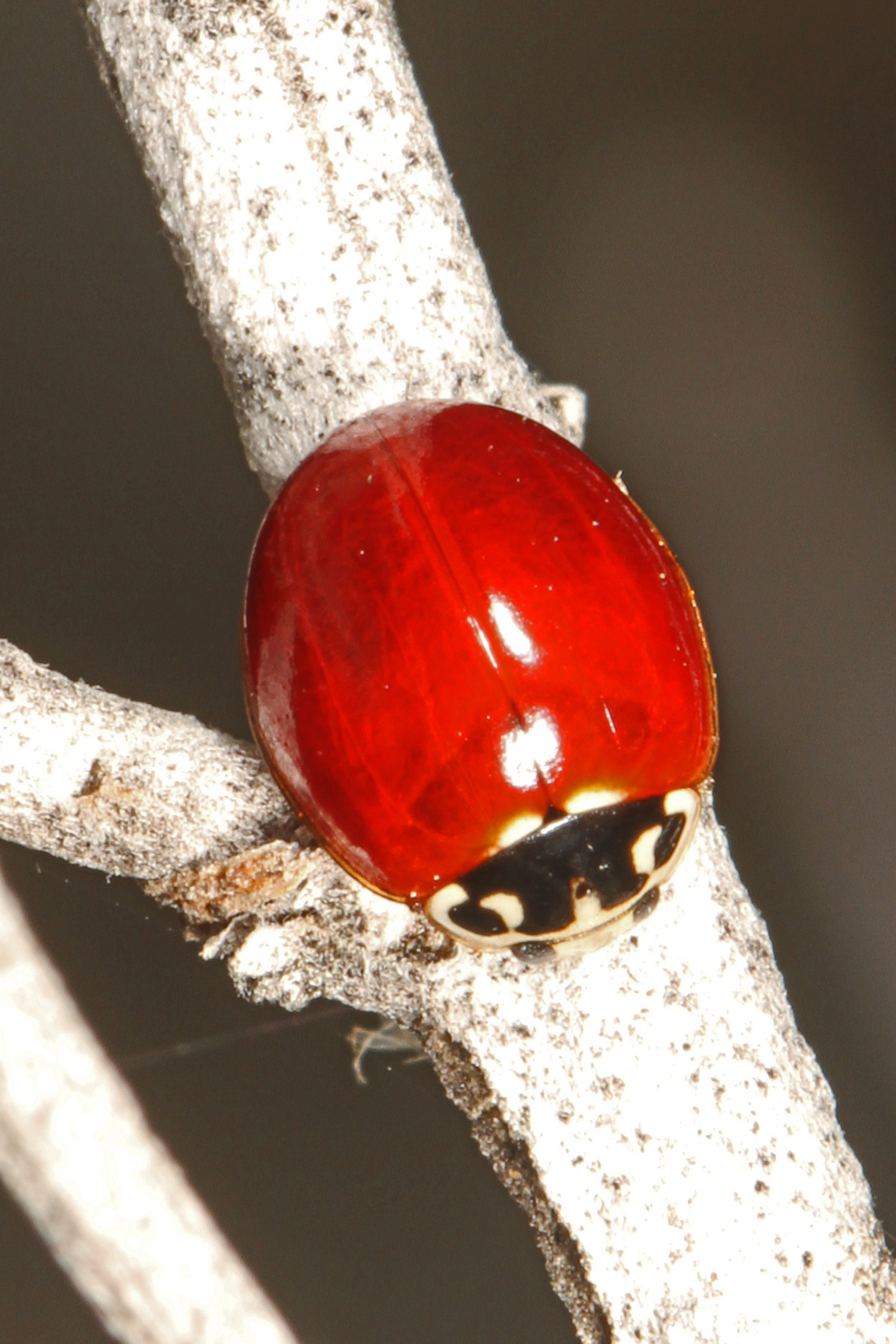
Cycloneda polita

== Species ==
These species belong to the genus Cycloneda:

- Cycloneda ancoralis Germar
- Cycloneda andresi Oroz, Bustamante & Cosio, 2009
- Cycloneda antillensis Crotch, 1874
- Cycloneda arcana Weise, 1898
- Cycloneda arcula (Erichson, 1847)
- Cycloneda bioculata Korschefsky, 1938
- Cycloneda bistillata Weise, 1898
- Cycloneda bistrisignata (Mulsant, 1850)
- Cycloneda boliviana (Mulsant, 1866)
- Cycloneda bustamantei González, 2018
- Cycloneda carolinae (Mulsant, 1866)
- Cycloneda caymana Chapin, 1957
- Cycloneda championi (Gorham, 1894)
- Cycloneda chilena (Weise, 1900)
- Cycloneda decemguttata Weise, 1898
- Cycloneda decempunctata Mader, 1953
- Cycloneda delauneyi (Fleutiaux & Sallé, 1889)
- Cycloneda dieguezi González, 2018
- Cycloneda dilychnis (Mulsant, 1850)
- Cycloneda disconsolata Vandenberg & González, 2006
- Cycloneda ebenina (Mulsant, 1866)
- Cycloneda ecuadorica (Timberlake, 1943)
- Cycloneda electra Gorham, 1892
- Cycloneda emarginata (Mulsant, 1850)
- Cycloneda eryngii (Mulsant, 1850)
- Cycloneda escalonai González, 2018
- Cycloneda fryii Crotch, 1874
- Cycloneda fulvipennis (Mulsant, 1850)
- Cycloneda galapagoensis (Van Dyke, 1953)
- Cycloneda galbanata Weise, 1902
- Cycloneda germainii (Crotch, 1874)
- Cycloneda girini (Mulsant, 1866)
- Cycloneda juliusweisei González, 2022
- Cycloneda lacrimosa González & Vandenberg, 2006
- Cycloneda limbicollis (Fairmaire, 1883)
- Cycloneda lucasii (Mulsant, 1850)
- Cycloneda lueri González, Bustamante & Oroz, 2008
- Cycloneda marcapatae Bustamante, Oroz & Cosio, 2009
- Cycloneda melanocera (Mulsant, 1850)
- Cycloneda munda (Say, 1835) (polished lady beetle)
- Cycloneda oculata (Fabricius, 1792)
- Cycloneda patagonica González & Vandenberg, 2006
- Cycloneda petitii (Mulsant, 1850)
- Cycloneda polita Casey, 1899 (western blood-red lady beetle)
- Cycloneda pretiosa Vandenberg & González, 2008
- Cycloneda pulchella (Klug, 1829)
- Cycloneda reclusa Weise, 1902
- Cycloneda retrospiciens Crotch, 1874
- Cycloneda sallei (Mulsant, 1850)
- Cycloneda sanguinea (Linnaeus, 1763) (spotless lady beetle)
- Cycloneda shannoni (Timberlake, 1943)
- Cycloneda sicardi (Brèthes, 1925)
- Cycloneda tenebrae González, 2022
- Cycloneda tricolorata (Gorham, 1894)
- Cycloneda vandenbergae González, Bustamante & Oróz, 2008
