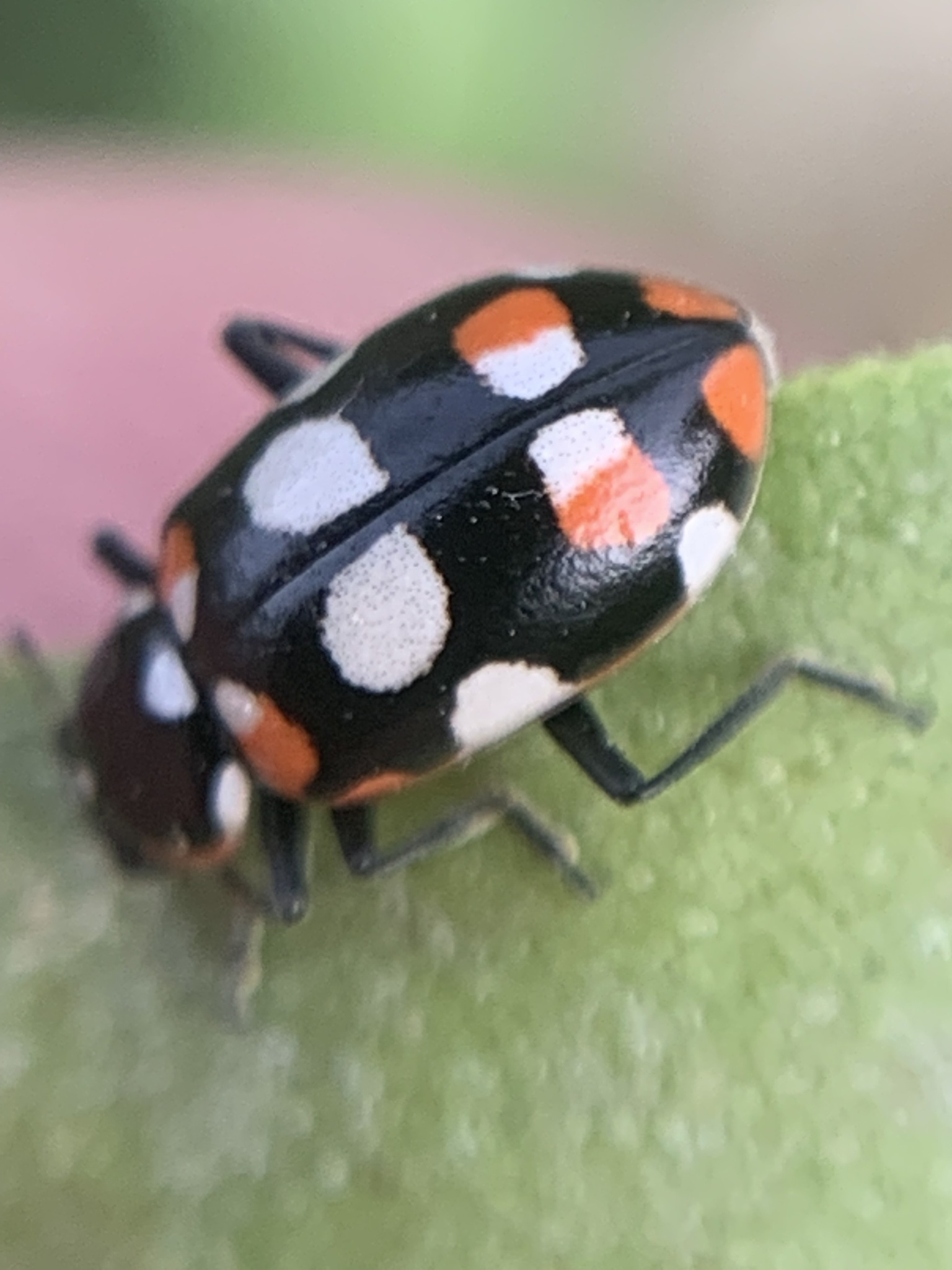

Scientific classification
- Kingdom: Animalia
- Phylum: Arthropoda
- Clade: Pancrustacea
- Class: Insecta
- Order: Coleoptera
- Suborder: Polyphaga
- Infraorder: Cucujiformia
- Family: Coccinellidae
- Genus: Eriopis
- Species: E. connexa

Binomial name
- Eriopis connexa (Germar, 1824)

Synonyms
- Coccinella connexa Germar, 1824

= Eriopis connexa =

Species of beetle

Eriopis connexa is a species of ladybird beetle that is native to South America. Both males and females mate multiple times with different individuals of the opposite sex, like most members of the family Coccinellidae. This promiscuous behavior leads to unique reproductive adaptations, such as sperm mixing. Females lay unfertilized eggs which their offspring consume upon hatching, thereby boosting offspring nutrition and reducing sibling cannibalism, . This predatory beetle species feeds primarily on aphids and is widespread throughout many agroecosystems, such as cotton, maize, sorghum, soybean, and wheat. Due to aphids being extremely damaging agricultural pests, E. connexa has been introduced to the United States for biological pest management. Recent studies on pyrethroid insecticide resistance in E. connexa have led to research by applied entomologists on the species' potential role in integrated pest management schemes in crop fields that rely on lambda-cyhalothrin (LCT), a common pyrethroid insecticide that is ineffective against aphid population control. The potential efficacy and success of the utilization of E. connexa in these programs is widely debated and is the focus of much recent research due to the lack of understanding regarding the effects of pyrethroid resistance on the behavior of this species.

== Geographic range ==
Eriopis connexa is a neotropical species native to South America, but has been introduced to the United States for biological pest management.

They may be found in Argentina (Buenos Aires, Catamarca, Córdoba, Chaco, Chubut, Entre Ríos, Formosa, La Rioja, Mendoza, Misiones, Neuquén, Río Negro, Salta, San Juan, Santa Fe, Santiago del Estero, Tucumán), Bolivia (Cochabamba, La Paz, Oruro), Brazil (Mato Grosso, Minas Gerais, Paraná, Pernambuco, Rio Grande do Sul, Santa Catarina, São Paulo), Ecuador (Guayas), Paraguay (Alto Paraná, Caazapá, Central, Kanindeyu, Paraguarí, Pte. Hayes, San Pedro), Peru (Apurimac, Arequipa, Ayacucho, Cusco, Lima), Uruguay (Florida, Maldonado, Montevideo, San José), and Venezuela.

== Habitat ==
Eriopis connexa is found throughout a wide variety of agroecosystems, such as cotton, maize, sorghum, pine, citrus, soybean, and wheat plants. In attempts to broaden the pest management potential of E. connexa, studies have indicated this predatory beetle species is effective in controlling aphid populations on both cabbage plants and greenhouse strawberry plants, suggesting there is greater range in potential E. connexa habitat than originally thought.

== Description ==
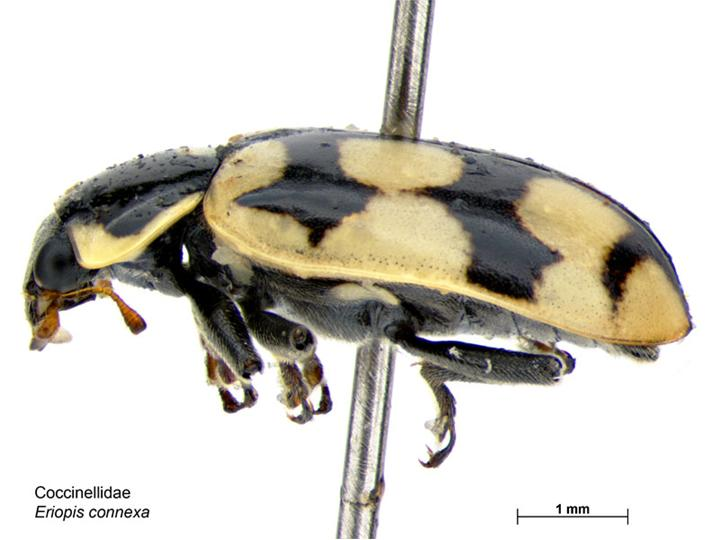
Lateral view of Eriopis connexa

Eriopis connexa has an oblong body shape. The base color is dark brown to black with yellowish relatively large, separated dots. The pronotum and the elytra (wing covers) have a yellowish margin. Each elytron has three separated dots and the enlargements of the margin, the pronotum two smaller dots and two enlargements of the margin.

There are not always visible indications of sexual dimorphism in this beetle species, but at certain times in adulthood, females will have extended abdomens for egg production. Additionally, adult females can be distinguished from adult males by their significantly heavier weight.

== Food resources ==
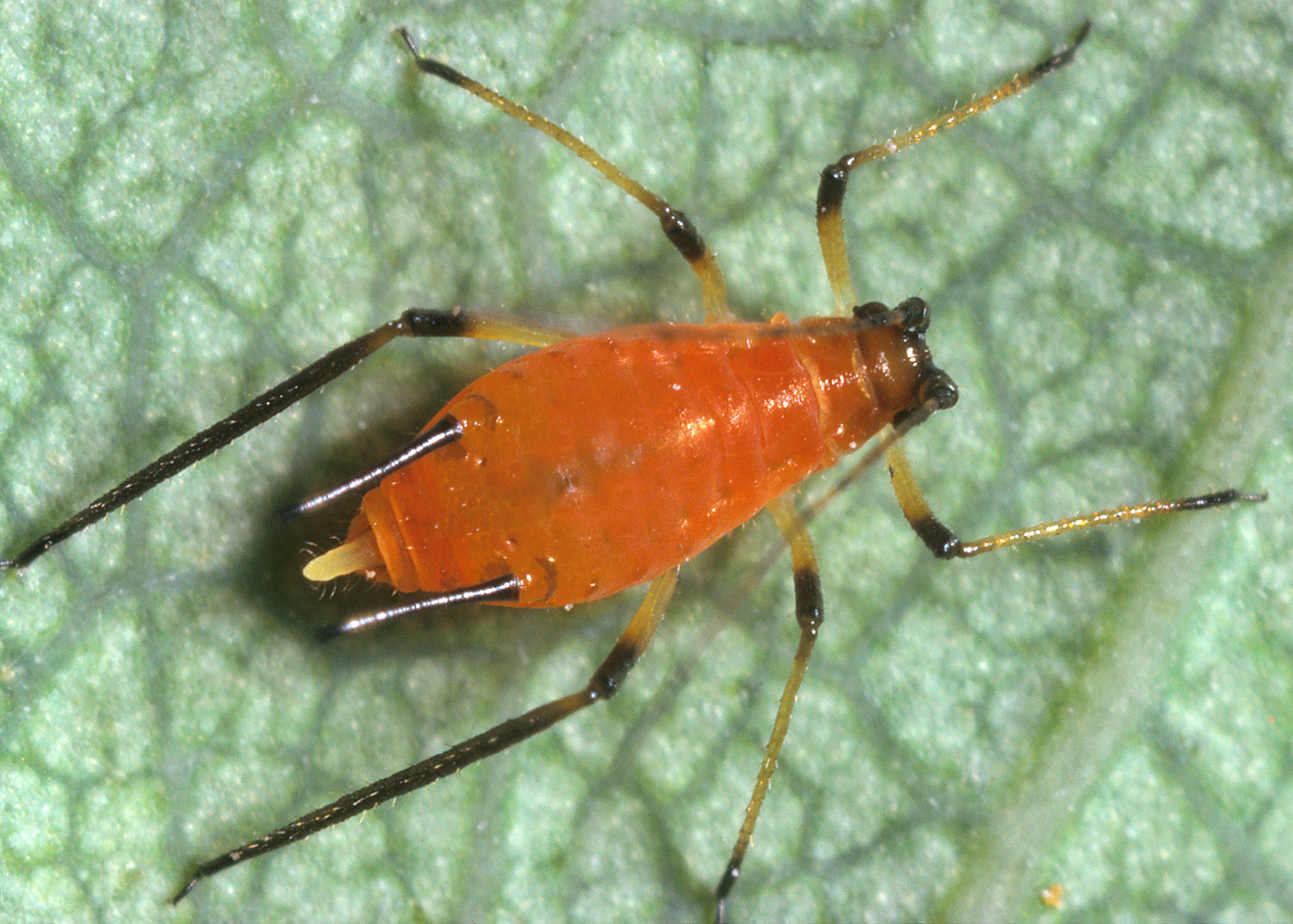
Aphid

=== Adults ===
Eriopis connexa is known for its voracious aphid predation. Still, it is not limited to aphid consumption as it is a polyphagous species and also consumes scale insects, mites, lepidopteran eggs, and whiteflies as supplementary prey. Furthermore, studies indicate that this beetle species is able to survive and successfully reproduce when solely consuming certain species of spider mites (Tetranychus urticae and Tetranychus ogmophallos). These studies also indicate that the species of prey does strongly influence E. connexa development, survival, and reproduction, and aphid consumption leads to optimal demographic outcomes. Host plants' chemical, morphological, and allelochemical features affect the nutritional value of arthropods, further complicating potential biological pest management.

== Life history ==
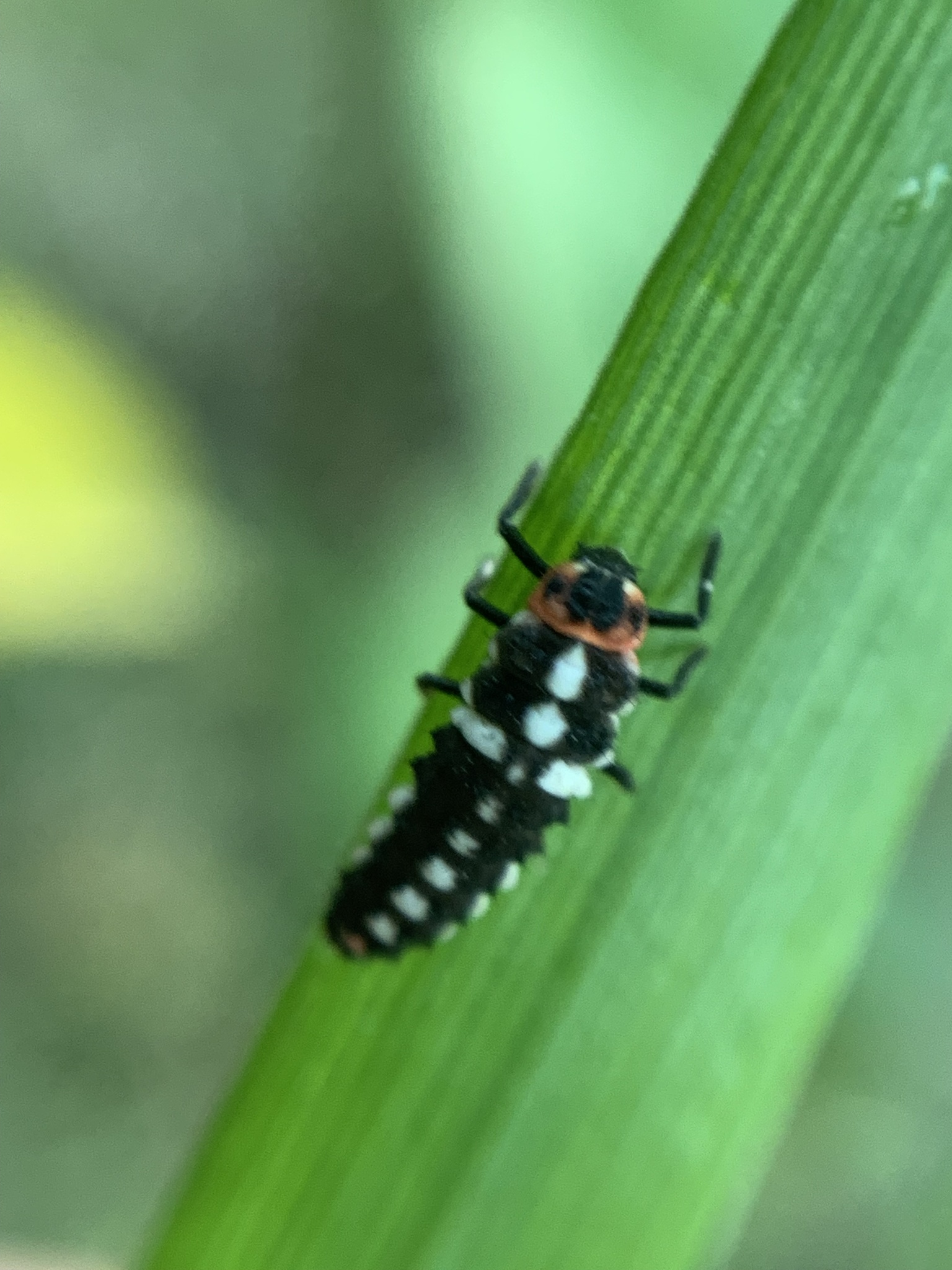
Eriopis connexa in larval stage

=== Life cycle ===
There are five main sequential stages of development in Eriopis connexa: egg, larva, pre-pupa, pupa, and adult. The larval stage can be further broken into four instars. Laboratory studies indicate that individuals spend approximately two days in each of the first three instar stages, nearly four days in the fourth instar stage, one day in the pre-pupa stage, three to four days in the pupa stage, and the rest of their lives in the adult stage. However, duration of each stage can change based on prey offered to Eriopis connexa. Individuals usually live for around 60 days in total. Both males and females reach full sexual maturity on the fifth day of the adult stage. Individuals of both sexes are sexually receptive on the third day but are not yet at their maximum fertility and fecundity. This may be due to incomplete maturation of sexual organs.

== Reproduction ==
=== Promiscuity and sperm mixing ===
Both males and females mate multiple times with different individuals of the opposite sex, making Eriopis connexa a polyamorous species like most members of its family. Polyandry is known to increase genetic diversity and offspring vigor, as well as allow for sperm competition, although increased matings sometimes present costs to females. In this beetle species, male spermatozoa are directly transferred to females through insemination not packaged in spermatophores, as in many other insect species. Mating order in Eriopis connexa does not affect offspring paternity and thus suggests sperm mixing is present in the female spermatheca. Sperm mixing is a powerful evolutionarily adaptive mechanism that favors the selection of superior sperm and results in sperm superior to that of monogamous species.

=== Trophic eggs ===
Female Eriopis connexa never reach complete fertility because they lay unfertilized trophic eggs which provide additional nutrition for their offspring when they hatch into larvae. Studies indicate that when E. connexa larvae are removed from their natal egg batch directly upon hatching, they experience lower survival rates than larvae allowed to remain on top of their natal egg batch for several hours. Even though there are costs for females to produce oocytes, laying trophic eggs is an evolutionary adaptation that improves larval nutrition and reduces sibling cannibalism.

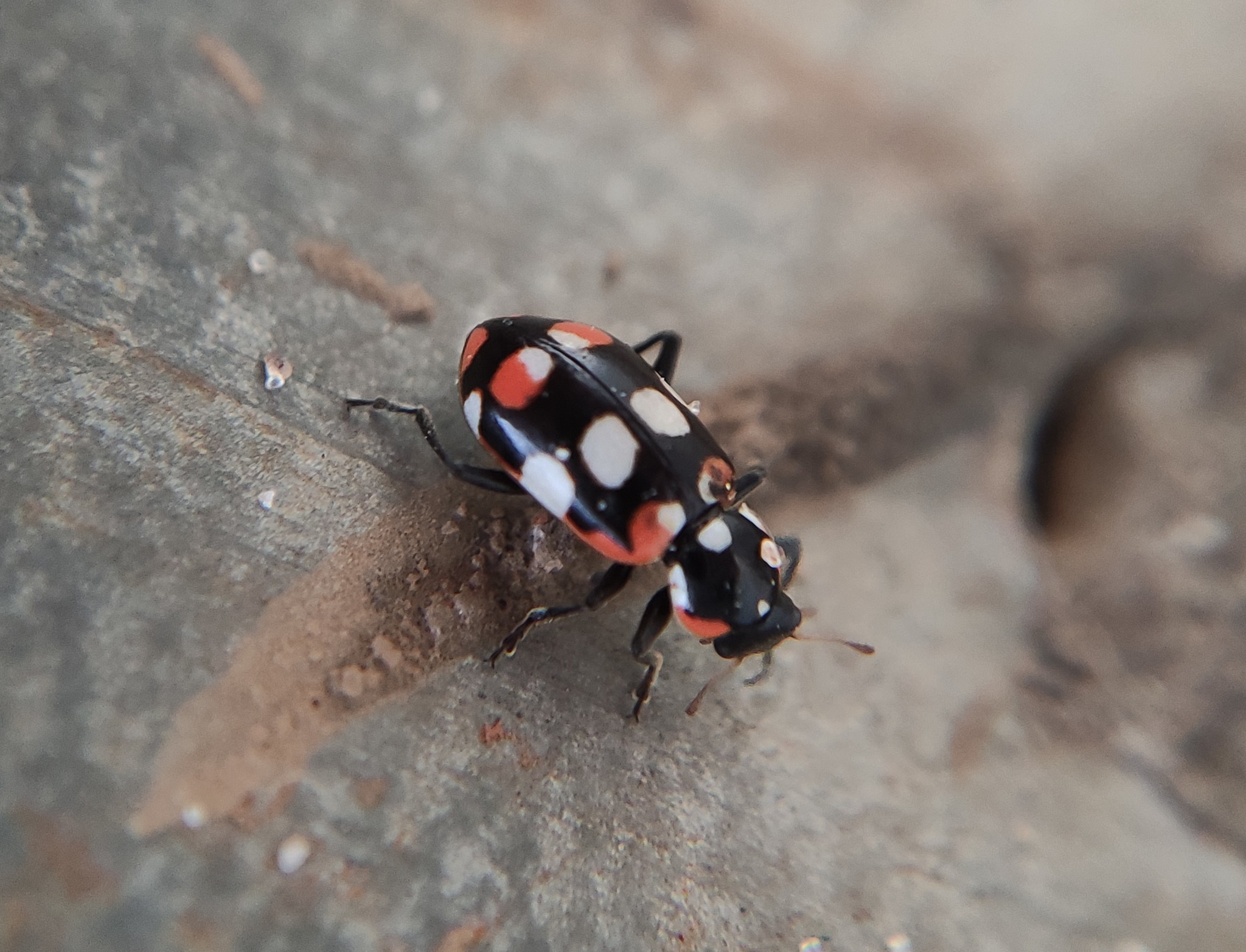

=== Copulation ===
Laboratory studies indicate that this beetle species will initiate copulation in under one minute of being allowed access to the opposite sex. Copulation duration does not affect fertility, and mating usually lasts for around 24 minutes. In closely related species of ladybird beetle (H. axyridis), males exhibit a body-shaking behavior when transferring spermatozoa to females, but this behavior is not present in male E. connexa. A similar body-shaking behavior is, however, present in female E. connexa, but in this species, the behavior is exhibited once at the start of copulation and once more to shake the male off and terminate the copulation. Post-copulatory behaviors such as female guarding, ejection and ingestion of seminal material have not been observed in E. connexa.

=== Male mating history ===
In many Coccinella species, egg viability is negatively correlated with paternal sexual activity, but this trend is not present in Eriopis connexa, suggesting males in this species have adapted to more frequent matings. There is, however, a negative correlation between oviposition time and paternal sexual activity in E. connexa, suggesting that allomones in male seminal fluid stimulate faster onset of oviposition in females and virgin males have greater quantities of allomones present in their seminal fluid. Allomonal effects in seminal fluid proteins can also create subtle paternal effects, such as increased offspring size or development time, but paternal effects are not present in E. connexa, suggesting males and females of this species have similar interests in progeny phenotypes.

== Interactions with humans ==
=== Agricultural use ===
Because Eriopis connexa is a voracious predator of aphids, a very destructive agricultural pest, and naturally occurs in crops of high economic importance, this predatory beetle species has been used frequently for biological control of pests. It was first introduced to the United States in order to control Russian wheat aphid (Diuraphasis norxia) populations. As insecticide resistance continues to evolve in many agricultural pests, alternative pest control methods have become more desirable and necessary. There is evidence that in South America, Eriopis connexa has potential as a natural predator of corn and sorghum pests.

=== Pyrethroid insecticide resistance ===
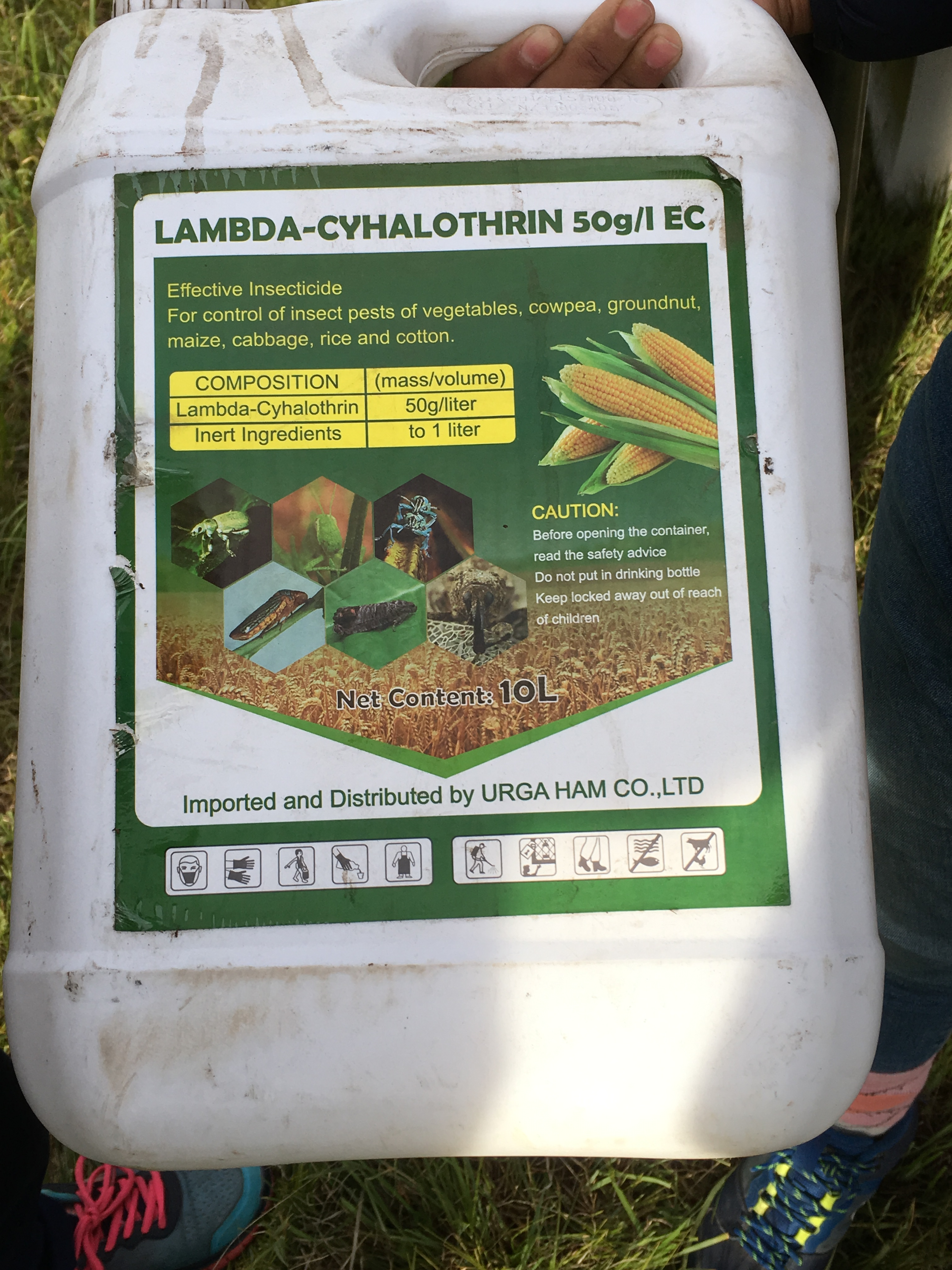
Lambda-cyhalothrin (LCT)

Pyrethroid insecticides are commonly used to target agricultural pests, such as boll weevils. Lambda-cyhalothrin, also known as LCT, is a common pyrethroid insecticide that is ineffective at controlling aphid populations. Laboratory experiments involving breeding generations of Eriopis connexa under increasing concentrations of lambda-cyhalothrin result in pyrethroid-resistant Eriopis connexa individuals. Later studies revealed pyrethroid resistance follows autosomal and semi-dominant inheritance patterns in this beetle species. This phenotype is associated with enhanced detoxification enzyme activity, which corresponds to the neurotoxic properties of pyrethroid insecticides. Furthermore, the pyrethroid resistance is not restricted to a single insecticide (such as LCT) and instead applies to multiple types of pyrethroid insecticides.

=== Effect of pyrethroid insecticide resistance on reproductive success ===
Selection pressure for resistance can lead to reduced performance in which resistant individuals are at a disadvantage when the selection pressure is removed. In the case of Eriopis connexa and pyrethroid resistance, the resistant phenotype is associated with decreased reproductive success. Pyrethroid-resistant females exhibit delayed egg-laying and reduced fecundity. Since pyrethroid resistance is not associated with an identifiable physical trait, females show no preference for or against it. Because sperm mixing is present in this species, some researchers suggest the first-generation offspring between a population of pyrethroid-susceptible Eriopis connexa and a released population of pyrethroid-resistant individuals will result in half of the offspring having the pyrethroid-resistant phenotype. Pyrethroid resistance is also associated with behavioral changes in Eriopis connexa, in which individuals take longer times to interact, females shake their body for a longer time prior to copulation, and males and females mate less frequently than the pyrethroid-susceptible individuals.

=== Potential issues in utilization of pyrethroid-resistant individuals ===
Some researchers suggest ecological mismatches between pyrethroid-resistant Eriopis connexa and agroecosystems will lead to adverse outcomes that won't be discovered through laboratory assays. Other concerns originate in the adaptive cost of resistance incurred by the pyrethroid-resistant females as they may cause pyrethroid-resistant individuals to be replaced by pyrethroid-susceptible populations in extended periods of low pyrethroid usage. Additionally, behavioral studies indicate decreased aggression in pyrethroid-resistant Eriopis connexa individuals, which may harm their efficacy of predation of agricultural pests. Another potential problem of utilizing Eriopis connexa in an integrated pest management scheme is that they forage for food in plant canopies, which can result in greater exposure to sprayed pesticides than even the target pests themselves.
