= Sexual evolution =

Sexual evolution may refer to:

- Evolution of sex
- Sexual selection
