= Alexey Kondrashov =

American geneticist

Alexey Simonovich Kondrashov
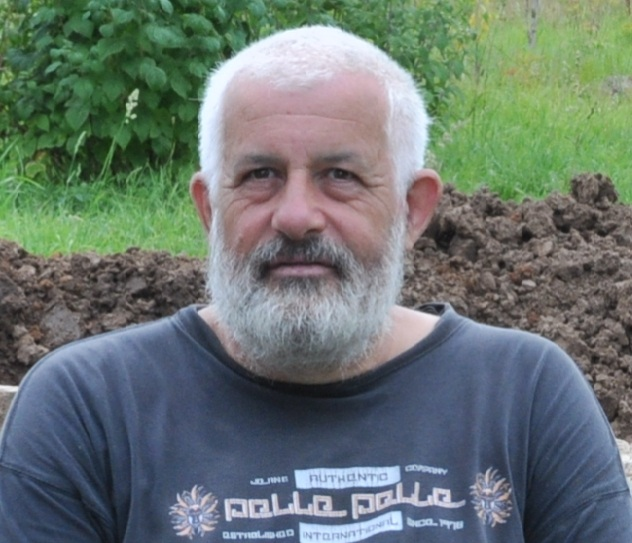
- Born: April 11, 1957 (age 69); Moscow, Russia
- Alma mater: Moscow State University (1978)
- Scientific career
- Fields: Biology
- Workplaces: University of Michigan

Alexey Simonovich Kondrashov (Russian: Алексе́й Си́монович Кондрашо́в) (born April 11, 1957) worked on a variety of subjects in evolutionary genetics. He is best known for the deterministic mutation hypothesis explaining the maintenance of sexual reproduction, his work on sympatric speciation, and his work on evaluating mutation rates.

Originally from the Soviet Union, A.S. Kondrashov worked in the United States from the early 1990s until his retirement in the early 2020s. His work currently focuses on measuring rate of spontaneous mutation in Drosophila. Also, he studies selection at the sequence level and protein evolution. He founded the laboratory of evolutionary genomics in the College of Bioengineering and Bioinformatics at Lomonosov Moscow State University.

== Early life and education ==
Alexey Kondrashov was born on April 11, 1957, in Moscow. His father was the Soviet biophysicist, Simon Shnoll. In the 1960s his family moved to Pushchino where he attended Middle School #1 (1966-1970). After some time, he transferred to the Pushchino's Middle School #2 (1970-1973). From 1973 to 1978 Kondrashov studied in the College of Genetics of Biology Department of the Moscow State University-Lomonosov. In 1984, he received his Ph.D. degree in Biology form The Moscow State University. In 1990, Kondrashov became an Associate Visiting Scientist in the Department of Genetics at the University of Wisconsin – Madison. He became an Assistant Professor of Ecology and Systematics at Cornell University in 1993, and associate professor in 1996. He is currently a professor at the University of Michigan in Ann Arbor, Michigan.

== Professional activity ==
One of the works of Alexey Kondrashov is called the Kondrashov Hypothesis or the deterministic mutation hypothesis. This hypothesis explains the benefits of sexual reproduction. Kondrashov argues that because of the slightly deleterious effect of mutations the population will tend to be composed of individuals with a small number of mutations. Because of the recombination effect of the sex on the genotypes the individuals with fewer and more deleterious mutations will be created. Since there is a major selective disadvantage to individuals with more mutations, these individuals die out. Alexey Kondrashov also worked in the field of protein evolution. Kondrashov states that amino acid composition of proteins varies between taxa, so it can evolve. For example, the organism that has more G+C base pairs in the genome will have more amino acids encoded by G+C rich codons. To support this hypothesis Kondrahov et al. compared sets of orthologous proteins from 15 taxa, which represent three domains of life. The amino acids with reducing frequencies was probably among the first incorporated into the genetic codes. Also, all amino acids except Ser, which have an increase in frequency, were probably recruited late. This process also continues to go today.

On August 22, 2012, Kondrashov wrote an article in Nature, describing a link between older fathers and a rise in disorders such as autism. The paper attracted a lot of public attention and Kondrashov was interviewed by The New York Times, Los Angeles Times, The Economist and several television networks. The research investigated the number of spontaneous (de novo) mutations in humans. It showed that a 40-year-old father transmits nearly two and a half times more mutations to his offspring than a 20-year-old father. As the example, a 20-year-old father can transmit nearly 25 random mutations to the offspring. The number of transmitted mutations is rising on two mutations for every more year. So, a 40-year-old father can transmit nearly 65 mutations to the offspring. The exact reason for it is not well understood, but the collecting of sperm of young men and freezing it for the future can be a clever choice. The brain is usually more affected by these mutations, because more genes are expressed in the brain than in any other organ.
