= Evolution of sexual reproduction =

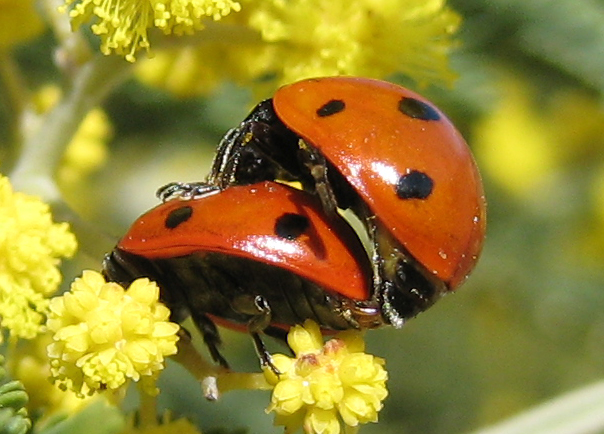
Ladybirds mating

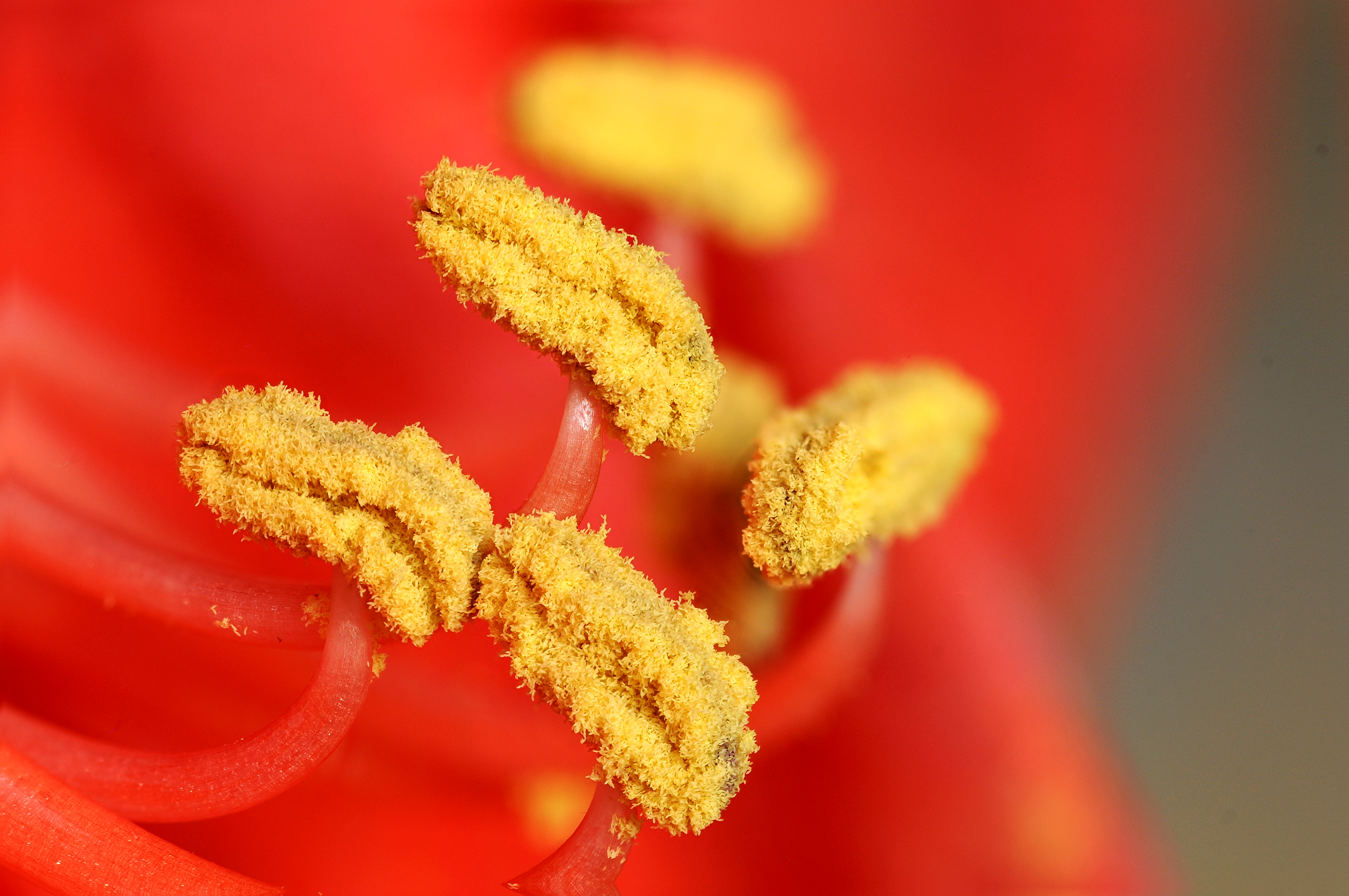
Pollen production is an essential step in sexual reproduction of seed plants.

Unsolved problem in biology
What selection pressures led to the evolution and maintenance of sexual reproduction?
More unsolved problems in biology

Sexually reproducing animals, plants, fungi and protists are thought to have evolved from a common ancestor that was a single-celled eukaryotic species. Sexual reproduction is widespread in eukaryotes, though a few eukaryotic species have secondarily lost the ability to reproduce sexually, such as Bdelloidea, and some plants and animals routinely reproduce asexually (by apomixis and parthenogenesis) without entirely having lost sex. The evolution of sexual reproduction contains two related yet distinct themes: its origin and its maintenance. Bacteria and Archaea (prokaryotes) have processes that can transfer DNA from one cell to another (conjugation, transformation, and transduction), but it is unclear if these processes are evolutionarily related to sexual reproduction in eukaryotes. In eukaryotes, true sexual reproduction by meiosis and cell fusion is thought to have arisen in the last eukaryotic common ancestor, possibly through several processes of varying success, and then to have persisted.

Since hypotheses for the origin of sex are difficult to verify experimentally (outside of evolutionary computation), most current work has focused on the persistence of sexual reproduction over evolutionary time. The maintenance of sexual reproduction (specifically, of its dioecious form) by natural selection in a highly competitive world has long been one of the major mysteries of biology, since both other known mechanisms of reproduction – asexual reproduction and hermaphroditism – possess apparent advantages over it. Asexual reproduction can proceed by budding, fission, or spore formation and does not involve the union of gametes, which accordingly results in a much faster rate of reproduction compared to sexual reproduction, where 50% of offspring are males and unable to produce offspring themselves. In hermaphroditic reproduction, each of the two parent organisms required for the formation of a zygote can provide either the male or the female gamete, which leads to advantages in both size and genetic variance of a population.

Sexual reproduction therefore must offer significant fitness advantages because, despite the two-fold cost of sex in relative slowness of propagation (see below), it dominates among multicellular forms of life, implying that the fitness of offspring produced by sexual processes outweighs the costs. Sexual reproduction derives from recombination, where parent genotypes are reorganised and shared with the offspring. This stands in contrast to single-parent asexual replication, where the offspring is always identical to the parents (barring mutation). Recombination supplies two fault-tolerance mechanisms at the molecular level: recombinational DNA repair (promoted during meiosis because homologous chromosomes pair at that time) and complementation (also known as heterosis, hybrid vigour, or masking of mutations).

== Historical perspective ==
Reproduction, including modes of sexual reproduction, features in the writings of Aristotle; modern philosophical-scientific thinking on the problem dates from at least Erasmus Darwin (1731–1802) in the 18th century. August Weismann picked up the thread in 1885, arguing that sex serves to generate genetic variation, as detailed in the majority of the explanations below. On the other hand, Charles Darwin (1809–1882) concluded that the effect of hybrid vigor (complementation) "is amply sufficient to account for the ... genesis of the two sexes". This is consistent with the repair and complementation hypothesis, described below. Since the emergence of the modern evolutionary synthesis in the 20th century, numerous biologists including W. D. Hamilton, Alexey Kondrashov, George C. Williams, Harris Bernstein, Carol Bernstein, Michael M. Cox, Frederic A. Hopf and Richard E. Michod – have suggested competing explanations for how a vast array of different living species maintain sexual reproduction.

== Advantages of sex and sexual reproduction ==
The concept of sex includes two fundamental phenomena: the sexual process (fusion of genetic information of two individuals) and sexual differentiation (separation of this information into two parts). Depending on the presence or absence of these phenomena, all of the existing forms of reproduction can be classified as asexual, hermaphrodite or dioecious. The sexual process and sexual differentiation are different phenomena, and, in essence, are diametrically opposed. The first creates (increases) diversity of genotypes, and the second decreases it by half.

Reproductive advantages of the asexual forms are in quantity of the progeny, and the advantages of the hermaphrodite forms are in maximal diversity. Transition from the hermaphrodite to dioecious state leads to a loss of at least half of the diversity. So, the primary challenge is to explain the advantages given by sexual differentiation, i.e. the benefits of two separate sexes compared to hermaphrodites rather than to explain benefits of sexual forms (hermaphrodite + dioecious) over asexual ones. It has already been understood that since sexual reproduction is not associated with any clear reproductive advantages over asexual reproduction, there should be some important advantages in evolution.

=== Advantages due to genetic variation, DNA repair and genetic complementation ===
For the advantage due to genetic variation, there are three possible reasons this might happen. First, sexual reproduction can combine the effects of two beneficial mutations in the same individual (i.e. sex aids in the spread of advantageous traits) without the mutations having to have occurred one after another in a single line of descendants. Second, sex acts to bring together currently deleterious mutations to create severely unfit individuals that are then eliminated from the population (i.e. sex aids in the removal of deleterious genes). However, in organisms containing only one set of chromosomes, deleterious mutations would be eliminated immediately, and therefore removal of harmful mutations is an unlikely benefit for sexual reproduction. Lastly, sex creates new gene combinations that may be more fit than previously existing ones, or may simply lead to reduced competition among relatives.

For the advantage due to DNA repair, there is an immediate large benefit of removing DNA damage by recombinational DNA repair during meiosis (assuming the initial mutation rate is higher than optimal), since this removal allows greater survival of progeny with undamaged DNA. The advantage of complementation to each sexual partner is avoidance of the bad effects of their deleterious recessive genes in progeny by the masking effect of normal dominant genes contributed by the other partner.

The classes of hypotheses based on the creation of variation are further broken down below. Any number of these hypotheses may be true in any given species (they are not mutually exclusive), and different hypotheses may apply in different species. However, a research framework based on creation of variation has yet to be found that allows one to determine whether the reason for sex is universal for all sexual species, and, if not, which mechanisms are acting in each species.

On the other hand, the maintenance of sex based on DNA repair and complementation applies widely to all sexual species.

=== Protection from major genetic mutation ===
In contrast to the view that sex promotes genetic variation, Heng, and Gorelick and Heng reviewed evidence that sex actually acts as a constraint on genetic variation. They consider that sex acts as a coarse filter, weeding out major genetic changes, such as chromosomal rearrangements, but permitting minor variation, such as changes at the nucleotide or gene level (that are often neutral) to pass through the sexual sieve.

=== Novel genotypes ===
This diagram illustrates how sex might create novel genotypes more rapidly. Two advantageous alleles A and B occur at random. The two alleles are recombined rapidly in a sexual population (top), but in an asexual population (bottom) the two alleles must independently arise because of clonal interference.

Sex could be a method by which novel genotypes are created. Because sex combines genes from two individuals, sexually reproducing populations can more easily combine advantageous genes than can asexual populations. If, in a sexual population, two different advantageous alleles arise at different loci on a chromosome in different members of the population, a chromosome containing the two advantageous alleles can be produced within a few generations by recombination. However, should the same two alleles arise in different members of an asexual population, the only way that one chromosome can develop the other allele is to independently gain the same mutation, which would take much longer. Several studies have addressed counterarguments, and the question of whether this model is sufficiently robust to explain the predominance of sexual versus asexual reproduction remains.

Ronald Fisher suggested that sex might facilitate the spread of advantageous genes by allowing them to better escape their genetic surroundings, if they should arise on a chromosome with deleterious genes.

Supporters of these theories respond to the balance argument that the individuals produced by sexual and asexual reproduction may differ in other respects too – which may influence the persistence of sexuality. For example, in the heterogamous water fleas of the genus Cladocera, sexual offspring form eggs which are better able to survive the winter versus those the fleas produce asexually.

=== Increased resistance to parasites ===
One of the most widely discussed theories to explain the persistence of sex is that it is maintained to assist sexual individuals in resisting parasites, also known as the Red Queen hypothesis.

When an environment changes, previously neutral or deleterious alleles can become favourable. If the environment changed sufficiently rapidly (i.e. between generations), these changes in the environment can make sex advantageous for the individual. Such rapid changes in environment are caused by the co-evolution between hosts and parasites.

Imagine, for example that there is one gene in parasites with two alleles p and P conferring two types of parasitic ability, and one gene in hosts with two alleles h and H, conferring two types of parasite resistance, such that parasites with allele p can attach themselves to hosts with the allele h, and P to H. Such a situation will lead to cyclic changes in allele frequency – as p increases in frequency, h will be disfavoured.

In reality, there will be several genes involved in the relationship between hosts and parasites. In an asexual population of hosts, offspring will only have the different parasitic resistance if a mutation arises. In a sexual population of hosts, however, offspring will have a new combination of parasitic resistance alleles.

In other words, like Lewis Carroll's Red Queen, sexual hosts are continually "running" (adapting) to "stay in one place" (resist parasites).

Evidence for this explanation for the evolution of sex is provided by comparison of the rate of molecular evolution of genes for kinases and immunoglobulins in the immune system with genes coding other proteins. The genes coding for immune system proteins evolve considerably faster.

Further evidence for the Red Queen hypothesis was provided by observing long-term dynamics and parasite coevolution in a "mixed" (sexual and asexual) population of snails (Potamopyrgus antipodarum). The number of sexuals, the number of asexuals, and the rates of parasite infection for both were monitored. It was found that clones that were plentiful at the beginning of the study became more susceptible to parasites over time. As parasite infections increased, the once plentiful clones dwindled dramatically in number. Some clonal types disappeared entirely. Meanwhile, sexual snail populations remained much more stable over time.

However, Hanley et al. studied mite infestations of a parthenogenetic gecko species and its two related sexual ancestral species. Contrary to expectation based on the Red Queen hypothesis, they found that the prevalence, abundance and mean intensity of mites in sexual geckos was significantly higher than in asexuals sharing the same habitat.

In 2011, researchers used the microscopic roundworm Caenorhabditis elegans as a host and the pathogenic bacteria Serratia marcescens to generate a host-parasite coevolutionary system in a controlled environment, allowing them to conduct more than 70 evolution experiments testing the Red Queen hypothesis. They genetically manipulated the mating system of C. elegans, causing populations to mate either sexually, by self-fertilization, or a mixture of both within the same population. Then they exposed those populations to the S. marcescens parasite. It was found that the self-fertilizing populations of C. elegans were rapidly driven extinct by the coevolving parasites while sex allowed populations to keep pace with their parasites, a result consistent with the Red Queen hypothesis. In natural populations of C. elegans, self-fertilization is the predominant mode of reproduction, but infrequent out-crossing events occur at a rate of about 1%.

=== Other hypotheses ===
Critics of the Red Queen hypothesis question whether the constantly changing environment of hosts and parasites is sufficiently common to explain the evolution of sex; an alternative is the court jester hypothesis, which emphasises abiotic factors including climate. Otto and Nuismer presented results showing that species interactions (e.g. host vs parasite interactions) typically select against sex. They concluded that, although the Red Queen hypothesis favors sex under certain circumstances, it alone does not account for the ubiquity of sex. Otto and Gerstein further stated that "it seems doubtful to us that strong selection per gene is sufficiently commonplace for the Red Queen hypothesis to explain the ubiquity of sex". Parker reviewed numerous genetic studies on plant disease resistance and failed to uncover a single example consistent with the assumptions of the Red Queen hypothesis.

== Disadvantages of sex and sexual reproduction ==
The paradox of the existence of sexual reproduction is that though it is ubiquitous in multicellular organisms, there are ostensibly many inherent disadvantages to reproducing sexually when weighed against the relative advantages of alternative forms of reproduction, such as asexual reproduction. Thus, because sexual reproduction abounds in complex multicellular life, there must be some significant benefit(s) to sex and sexual reproduction that compensates for these fundamental disadvantages.

=== Population expansion cost of sex ===
Among the most limiting disadvantages to the evolution of sexual reproduction by natural selection is that an asexual population can grow much more rapidly than a sexual one with each generation.

For example, assume that the entire population of a theoretical species has 100 total organisms consisting of two sexes (i.e. males and females), with 50:50 male-to-female representation, and that only the females of this species can bear offspring. If all capable members of this population procreated once, a total of 50 offspring would be produced (the F_{1} generation). Contrast this outcome with an asexual species, in which each and every member of an equally sized 100-organism population is capable of bearing young. If all capable members of this asexual population procreated once, a total of 100 offspring would be produced – twice as many as produced by the sexual population in a single generation.

This diagram illustrates the two-fold cost of sex. If each individual contributes to the same number of offspring (two), (a) the sexual population remains the same size each generation, where the (b) asexual population doubles in size each generation.

This idea is sometimes referred to as the two-fold cost of sexual reproduction. It was first described mathematically by John Maynard Smith. In his manuscript, Smith further speculated on the impact of an asexual mutant arising in a sexual population, which suppresses meiosis and allows eggs to develop into offspring genetically identical to the mother by mitotic division. The mutant-asexual lineage would double its representation in the population each generation, all else being equal.

Technically the problem above is not one of sexual reproduction but of having a subset of organisms incapable of bearing offspring. Indeed, some multicellular organisms (isogamous) engage in sexual reproduction but all members of the species are capable of bearing offspring. The two-fold reproductive disadvantage assumes that males contribute only genes to their offspring and sexual females spend half their reproductive potential on sons. Thus, in this formulation, the principal cost of sex is that males and females must successfully copulate, which almost always involves expending energy to come together through time and space. Asexual organisms need not expend the energy necessary to find a mate.

Yasui proposed the "double-income anisogamy" hypothesis as a direct-benefit explanation for how anisogamy may offset the two-fold cost of sex. The hypothesis argues that genetic benefits of sex, such as Red Queen dynamics, may be too delayed to prevent the initial spread of thelytokous asexual mutants. Instead, it proposes that males defending resources required for offspring development can provide immediate material benefits to females that accept mating, while thelytokous females are excluded from those male-defended resources. If females use male-associated resources mainly to increase the survival of existing offspring rather than to produce additional eggs, the number of surviving daughters may be doubled, thereby offsetting the demographic cost of producing males. A Kagawa University press release summarized the hypothesis for a general audience.

=== Selfish cytoplasmic genes ===
Sexual reproduction implies that chromosomes and alleles segregate and recombine in every generation, but not all genes are transmitted together to the offspring. There is a chance of spreading mutants that cause unfair transmission at the expense of their non-mutant colleagues. These mutations are referred to as "selfish" because they promote their own spread at the cost of alternative alleles or of the host organism; they include nuclear meiotic drivers and selfish cytoplasmic genes. Meiotic drivers are genes that distort meiosis to produce gametes containing themselves more than the 50% of the time expected by chance. A selfish cytoplasmic gene is a gene located in an organelle, plasmid or intracellular parasite that modifies reproduction to cause its own increase at the expense of the cell or organism that carries it.

=== Genetic heritability cost of sex ===
A sexually reproducing organism only passes on ~50% of its own genetic material to each L2 offspring. This is a consequence of the fact that gametes from sexually reproducing species are haploid. Again, however, this is not applicable to all sexual organisms. There are numerous species which are sexual but do not have a genetic-loss problem because they do not produce males or females. Yeast, for example, are isogamous sexual organisms which have two mating types which fuse and recombine their haploid genomes. Both sexes reproduce during the haploid and diploid stages of their life cycle and have a 100% chance of passing their genes into their offspring.

Some species avoid the 50% cost of sexual reproduction, although they have "sex" (in the sense of genetic recombination). In these species (e.g., bacteria, ciliates, dinoflagellates and diatoms), "sex" and reproduction occur separately.

== DNA repair and complementation ==
As discussed in the earlier part of this article, sexual reproduction is conventionally explained as an adaptation for producing genetic variation through allelic recombination. As acknowledged above, however, serious problems with this explanation have led many biologists to conclude that the benefit of sex is a major unsolved problem in evolutionary biology.

An alternative "informational" approach to this problem has led to the view that the two fundamental aspects of sex, genetic recombination and outcrossing, are adaptive responses to the two major sources of "noise" in transmitting genetic information. Genetic noise can occur as either physical damage to the genome (e.g. chemically altered bases of DNA or breaks in the chromosome) or replication errors (mutations). This alternative view is referred to as the repair and complementation hypothesis, to distinguish it from the traditional variation hypothesis.

The repair and complementation hypothesis assumes that genetic recombination is fundamentally a DNA repair process, and that when it occurs during meiosis it is an adaptation for repairing the genomic DNA which is passed on to progeny. Recombinational repair is the only repair process known which can accurately remove double-strand damages in DNA, and such damages are both common in nature and ordinarily lethal if not repaired. For instance, double-strand breaks in DNA occur about 50 times per cell cycle in human cells (see naturally occurring DNA damage). Recombinational repair is prevalent from the simplest viruses to the most complex multicellular eukaryotes. It is effective against many different types of genomic damage, and in particular is highly efficient at overcoming double-strand damages. Studies of the mechanism of meiotic recombination indicate that meiosis is an adaptation for repairing DNA. These considerations form the basis for the first part of the repair and complementation hypothesis.

In some lines of descent from the earliest organisms, the diploid stage of the sexual cycle, which was at first transient, became the predominant stage, because it allowed complementation – the masking of deleterious recessive mutations (i.e. hybrid vigor or heterosis). Outcrossing, the second fundamental aspect of sex, is maintained by the advantage of masking mutations and the disadvantage of inbreeding (mating with a close relative) which allows expression of recessive mutations (commonly observed as inbreeding depression). This is in accord with Charles Darwin, who concluded that the adaptive advantage of sex is hybrid vigor; or as he put it, "the offspring of two individuals, especially if their progenitors have been subjected to very different conditions, have a great advantage in height, weight, constitutional vigor and fertility over the self fertilised offspring from either one of the same parents."

However, outcrossing may be abandoned in favor of parthenogenesis or selfing (which retain the advantage of meiotic recombinational repair) under conditions in which the costs of mating are very high. For instance, costs of mating are high when individuals are rare in a geographic area, such as when there has been a forest fire and the individuals entering the burned area are the initial ones to arrive. At such times mates are hard to find, and this favors parthenogenic species.

In the view of the repair and complementation hypothesis, the removal of DNA damage by recombinational repair produces a new, less deleterious form of informational noise, allelic recombination, as a by-product. This lesser informational noise generates genetic variation, viewed by some as the major effect of sex, as discussed in the earlier parts of this article.

== Deleterious mutation clearance ==
Mutations can have many different effects upon an organism. It is generally believed that the majority of non-neutral mutations are deleterious, which means that they will cause a decrease in the organism's overall fitness. If a mutation has a deleterious effect, it will then usually be removed from the population by the process of natural selection. Sexual reproduction is believed to be more efficient than asexual reproduction in removing those mutations from the genome.

There are two main hypotheses which explain how sex may act to remove deleterious genes from the genome.

=== Evading harmful mutation build-up ===
While DNA is able to recombine to modify alleles, DNA is also susceptible to mutations within the sequence that can affect an organism in a negative manner. Asexual organisms do not have the ability to recombine their genetic information to form new and differing alleles. Once a mutation occurs in the DNA or other genetic carrying sequence, there is no way for the mutation to be removed from the population until another mutation occurs that ultimately deletes the primary mutation. This is rare among organisms.

Hermann Joseph Muller introduced the idea that mutations build up in asexual reproducing organisms. Muller described this occurrence by comparing the mutations that accumulate as a ratchet. Each mutation that arises in asexually reproducing organisms turns the ratchet once. The ratchet is unable to be rotated backwards, only forwards. The next mutation that occurs turns the ratchet once more. Additional mutations in a population continually turn the ratchet and the mutations, mostly deleterious, continually accumulate without recombination. These mutations are passed onto the next generation because the offspring are exact genetic clones of their parents. The genetic load of organisms and their populations will increase due to the addition of multiple deleterious mutations and decrease the overall reproductive success and fitness.

For sexually reproducing populations, studies have shown that single-celled bottlenecks are beneficial for resisting mutation build-up. Passaging a population through a single-celled bottleneck involves the fertilization event occurring with haploid sets of DNA, forming one fertilized cell. For example, humans undergo a single-celled bottleneck in that the haploid sperm fertilizes the haploid egg, forming the diploid zygote, which is unicellular. This passage through a single cell is beneficial in that it lowers the chance of mutations from being passed on through multiple individuals. Instead, the mutation is only passed onto one individual. Further studies using Dictyostelium discoideum suggest that this unicellular initial stage is important for resisting mutations due to the importance of high relatedness. Highly related individuals are more closely related, and more clonal, whereas less related individuals are less so, increasing the likelihood that an individual in a population of low relatedness may have a detrimental mutation. Highly related populations also tend to thrive better than lowly related because the cost of sacrificing an individual is greatly offset by the benefit gained by its relatives and in turn, its genes, according to kin selection. The studies with D. discoideum showed that conditions of high relatedness resisted mutant individuals more effectively than those of low relatedness, suggesting the importance of high relatedness to resist mutations from proliferating.

=== Removal of deleterious genes ===
Diagram illustrating different relationships between numbers of mutations and fitness. Kondrashov's model requires synergistic epistasis, which is represented by the red line – each subsequent mutation has a disproportionately large effect on the organism's fitness.

This hypothesis was proposed by Alexey Kondrashov, and is sometimes known as the deterministic mutation hypothesis. It assumes that the majority of deleterious mutations are only slightly deleterious, and affect the individual such that the introduction of each additional mutation has an increasingly large effect on the fitness of the organism. This relationship between number of mutations and fitness is known as synergistic epistasis.

By way of analogy, think of a car with several minor faults. Each is not sufficient alone to prevent the car from running, but in combination, the faults combine to prevent the car from functioning.

Similarly, an organism may be able to cope with a few defects, but the presence of many mutations could overwhelm its backup mechanisms.

Kondrashov argues that the slightly deleterious nature of mutations means that the population will tend to be composed of individuals with a small number of mutations. Sex will act to recombine these genotypes, creating some individuals with fewer deleterious mutations, and some with more. Because there is a major selective disadvantage to individuals with more mutations, these individuals die out. In essence, sex compartmentalises the deleterious mutations.

There has been much criticism of Kondrashov's theory, since it relies on two key restrictive conditions. The first requires that the rate of deleterious mutation should exceed one per genome per generation in order to provide a substantial advantage for sex. While there is some empirical evidence for it (for example in Drosophila and E. coli), there is also strong evidence against it. Thus, for instance, for the sexual species Saccharomyces cerevisiae (yeast) and Neurospora crassa (fungus), the mutation rate per genome per replication are 0.0027 and 0.0030 respectively. For the nematode worm Caenorhabditis elegans, the mutation rate per effective genome per sexual generation is 0.036. Secondly, there should be strong interactions among loci (synergistic epistasis), a mutation-fitness relation for which there is only limited evidence. Conversely, there is also the same amount of evidence that mutations show no epistasis (purely additive model) or antagonistic interactions (each additional mutation has a disproportionally small effect).

== Other explanations ==
=== Geodakyan's evolutionary theory of sex ===
Geodakyan suggested that sexual dimorphism provides a partitioning of a species' phenotypes into at least two functional partitions: a female partition that secures beneficial features of the species and a male partition that emerged in species with more variable and unpredictable environments. The male partition is suggested to be an "experimental" part of the species that allows the species to expand their ecological niche, and to have alternative configurations. This theory underlines the higher variability and higher mortality in males, in comparison to females. This functional partitioning also explains the higher susceptibility to disease in males, in comparison to females and therefore includes the idea of "protection against parasites" as another functionality of male sex. Geodakyan's evolutionary theory of sex was developed in Russia in 1960–1980 and was not known to the West till the era of the Internet. Trofimova, who analysed psychological sex differences, hypothesised that the male sex might also provide a "redundancy pruning" function.

=== Speed of evolution ===
Ilan Eshel suggested that sex prevents rapid evolution. He suggests that recombination breaks up favourable gene combinations more often than it creates them, and sex is maintained because it ensures selection is longer-term than in asexual populations – so the population is less affected by short-term changes. This explanation is not widely accepted, as its assumptions are very restrictive.

It has recently been shown in experiments with Chlamydomonas algae that sex can remove the speed limit on evolution.

An information theoretic analysis using a simplified but useful model shows that in asexual reproduction, the information gain per generation of a species is limited to 1 bit per generation, while in sexual reproduction, the information gain is bounded by $\sqrt G$, where $G$ is the size of the genome in bits.

=== Libertine bubble theory ===
The evolution of sex can alternatively be described as a kind of gene exchange that is independent from reproduction. According to the Thierry Lodé's "libertine bubble theory", sex originated from an archaic gene transfer process among prebiotic bubbles. The contact among the pre-biotic bubbles could, through simple food or parasitic reactions, promote the transfer of genetic material from one bubble to another. That interactions between two organisms be in balance appear to be a sufficient condition to make these interactions evolutionarily efficient, i.e. to select bubbles that tolerate these interactions ("libertine" bubbles) through a blind evolutionary process of self-reinforcing gene correlations and compatibility.

The "libertine bubble theory" proposes that meiotic sex evolved in proto-eukaryotes to solve a problem that bacteria did not have, namely a large amount of DNA material, occurring in an archaic step of proto-cell formation and genetic exchanges. So that, rather than providing selective advantages through reproduction, sex could be thought of as a series of separate events which combines step-by-step some very weak benefits of recombination, meiosis, gametogenesis and syngamy. Therefore, current sexual species could be descendants of primitive organisms that practiced more stable exchanges in the long term, while asexual species have emerged, much more recently in evolutionary history, from the conflict of interest resulting from anisogamy.

Parasites and Muller's ratchet

R. Stephen Howard and Curtis Lively were the first to suggest that the combined effects of parasitism and mutation accumulation can lead to an increased advantage to sex under conditions not otherwise predicted (Nature, 1994). Using computer simulations, they showed that when the two mechanisms act simultaneously the advantage to sex over asexual reproduction is larger than for either factor operating alone.

== Origin of sexual reproduction ==
Life timeline
← / Earth formed; ← / Earliest water; ← / LUCA; ← / Earliest fossils; ← / Great Oxygenation Event; ← / Sexual reproduction; ← / Earliest fungi; ← / Neoproterozoic oxygenation event; ← / Ediacaran biota; ← / Cambrian explosion; ← / Earliest tetrapods; ← / Earliest hominoid
(million years ago)

Many protists reproduce sexually, as do many multicellular plants, animals, and fungi. In the eukaryotic fossil record, sexual reproduction first appeared around 2 billion years ago in the Proterozoic Eon, although a later date, around 1.2 billion years ago, based on the fossils of the red algae Bangiomorpha pubescens, has also been presented. Nonetheless, all sexually reproducing eukaryotic organisms likely derive from a single-celled common ancestor. It is probable that the evolution of sex was an integral part of the evolution of the first eukaryotic cell. There are a few species which have secondarily lost this feature, such as Bdelloidea and some parthenocarpic plants.

=== Diploidy ===
Organisms need to replicate their genetic material in an efficient and reliable manner. The necessity to repair genetic damage is one of the leading theories explaining the origin of sexual reproduction. Diploid individuals can repair a damaged section of their DNA via homologous recombination, since there are two copies of the gene in the cell and if one copy is damaged, the other copy is unlikely to be damaged at the same site.

A harmful damage in a haploid individual, on the other hand, is more likely to become fixed (i.e. permanent), since any DNA repair mechanism would have no source from which to recover the original undamaged sequence. The most primitive form of sex may have been one organism with damaged DNA replicating an undamaged strand from a similar organism in order to repair itself.

=== Meiosis ===
Sexual reproduction appears to have arisen very early in eukaryotic evolution, implying that the essential features of meiosis were already present in the last eukaryotic common ancestor. In extant organisms, proteins with central functions in meiosis are similar to key proteins in natural transformation in bacteria and DNA transfer in archaea. For example, recA recombinase, that catalyses the key functions of DNA homology search and strand exchange in the bacterial sexual process of transformation, has orthologs in eukaryotes that perform similar functions in meiotic recombination

Natural transformation in bacteria, DNA transfer in archaea, and meiosis in eukaryotic microorganisms are induced by stressful circumstances such as overcrowding, resource depletion, and DNA damaging conditions. This suggests that these sexual processes are adaptations for dealing with stress, particularly stress that causes DNA damage. In bacteria, these stresses induce an altered physiologic state, termed competence, that allows active take-up of DNA from a donor bacterium and the integration of this DNA into the recipient genome (see Natural competence) allowing recombinational repair of the recipients' damaged DNA.

If environmental stresses leading to DNA damage were a persistent challenge to the survival of early microorganisms, then selection would likely have been continuous through the prokaryote to eukaryote transition, and adaptative adjustments would have followed a course in which bacterial transformation or archaeal DNA transfer naturally gave rise to sexual reproduction in eukaryotes.

=== Virus-like RNA-based origin ===
Sex might also have been present even earlier, in the hypothesized RNA world that preceded DNA cellular life forms. One proposed origin of sex in the RNA world was based on the type of sexual interaction that is known to occur in extant single-stranded segmented RNA viruses, such as influenza virus, and in extant double-stranded segmented RNA viruses such as reovirus.

Exposure to conditions that cause RNA damage could have led to blockage of replication and death of these early RNA life forms. Sex would have allowed re-assortment of segments between two individuals with damaged RNA, permitting undamaged combinations of RNA segments to come together, thus allowing survival. Such a regeneration phenomenon, known as multiplicity reactivation, occurs in the influenza virus and reovirus.

=== Parasitic DNA elements ===
Another theory is that sexual reproduction originated from selfish parasitic genetic elements that exchange genetic material (that is: copies of their own genome) for their transmission and propagation. In some organisms, sexual reproduction has been shown to enhance the spread of parasitic genetic elements (e.g. yeast, filamentous fungi).

Bacterial conjugation is a form of genetic exchange that some sources describe as "sex", but technically is not a form of reproduction, even though it is a form of horizontal gene transfer. However, it does support the "selfish gene" part theory, since the gene itself is propagated through the F-plasmid.

A similar origin of sexual reproduction is proposed to have evolved in ancient haloarchaea as a combination of two independent processes: jumping genes and plasmid swapping.

=== Partial predation ===
A third theory is that sex evolved as a form of cannibalism: One primitive organism ate another one, but instead of completely digesting it, some of the eaten organism's DNA was incorporated into the DNA of the eater.

=== Vaccination-like process ===
Sex may also be derived from another prokaryotic process. A comprehensive theory called "origin of sex as vaccination" proposes that eukaryan sex-as-syngamy (fusion sex) arose from prokaryan unilateral sex-as-infection, when infected hosts began swapping nuclearised genomes containing coevolved, vertically transmitted symbionts that provided protection against horizontal superinfection by other, more virulent symbionts.

Consequently, sex-as-meiosis (fission sex) would evolve as a host strategy for uncoupling from (and thereby render impotent) the acquired symbiotic/parasitic genes.

== Mechanistic origin of sexual reproduction ==
While theories positing fitness benefits that led to the origin of sex are often problematic, several theories addressing the emergence of the mechanisms of sexual reproduction have been proposed.

=== Viral eukaryogenesis ===
The viral eukaryogenesis (VE) theory proposes that eukaryotic cells arose from a combination of a lysogenic virus, an archaean, and a bacterium. This model suggests that the nucleus originated when the lysogenic virus incorporated genetic material from the archaean and the bacterium and took over the role of information storage for the amalgam. The archaeal host transferred much of its functional genome to the virus during the evolution of cytoplasm, but retained the function of gene translation and general metabolism. The bacterium transferred most of its functional genome to the virus as it transitioned into a mitochondrion.

For these transformations to lead to the eukaryotic cell cycle, the VE hypothesis specifies a pox-like virus as the lysogenic virus. A pox-like virus is a likely ancestor because of its fundamental similarities with eukaryotic nuclei. These include a double stranded DNA genome, a linear chromosome with short telomeric repeats, a complex membrane bound capsid, the ability to produce capped mRNA, and the ability to export the capped mRNA across the viral membrane into the cytoplasm. The presence of a lysogenic pox-like virus ancestor explains the development of meiotic division, an essential component of sexual reproduction.

Meiotic division in the VE hypothesis arose because of the evolutionary pressures placed on the lysogenic virus as a result of its inability to enter into the lytic cycle. This selective pressure resulted in the development of processes allowing the viruses to spread horizontally throughout the population. The outcome of this selection was cell-to-cell fusion. (This is distinct from the conjugation methods used by bacterial plasmids under evolutionary pressure, with important consequences.) The possibility of this kind of fusion is supported by the presence of fusion proteins in the envelopes of the pox viruses that allow them to fuse with host membranes. These proteins could have been transferred to the cell membrane during viral reproduction, enabling cell-to-cell fusion between the virus host and an uninfected cell. The theory proposes meiosis originated from the fusion between two cells infected with related but different viruses which recognised each other as uninfected. After the fusion of the two cells, incompatibilities between the two viruses result in a meiotic-like cell division.

The two viruses established in the cell would initiate replication in response to signals from the host cell. A mitosis-like cell cycle would proceed until the viral membranes dissolved, at which point linear chromosomes would be bound together with centromeres. The homologous nature of the two viral centromeres would incite the grouping of both sets into tetrads. It is speculated that this grouping may be the origin of crossing over, characteristic of the first division in modern meiosis. The partitioning apparatus of the mitotic-like cell cycle the cells used to replicate independently would then pull each set of chromosomes to one side of the cell, still bound by centromeres. These centromeres would prevent their replication in subsequent division, resulting in four daughter cells with one copy of one of the two original pox-like viruses. The process resulting from combination of two similar pox viruses within the same host closely mimics meiosis.

=== Neomuran revolution ===
An alternative theory, proposed by Thomas Cavalier-Smith, was labeled the Neomuran revolution. The designation "Neomuran revolution" refers to the appearances of the common ancestors of eukaryotes and archaea. Cavalier-Smith proposes that the first neomurans emerged 850 million years ago. Other molecular biologists assume that this group appeared much earlier, but Cavalier-Smith dismisses these claims because they are based on the "theoretically and empirically" unsound model of molecular clocks. Cavalier-Smith's theory of the Neomuran revolution has implications for the evolutionary history of the cellular machinery for recombination and sex. It suggests that this machinery evolved in two distinct bouts separated by a long period of stasis; first the appearance of recombination machinery in a bacterial ancestor which was maintained for 3 Gy(billion years), until the neomuran revolution when the mechanics were adapted to the presence of nucleosomes. The archaeal products of the revolution maintained recombination machinery that was essentially bacterial, whereas the eukaryotic products broke with this bacterial continuity. They introduced cell fusion and ploidy cycles into cell life histories. Cavalier-Smith argues that both bouts of mechanical evolution were motivated by similar selective forces: the need for accurate DNA replication without loss of viability.

=== Seesaw effect ===
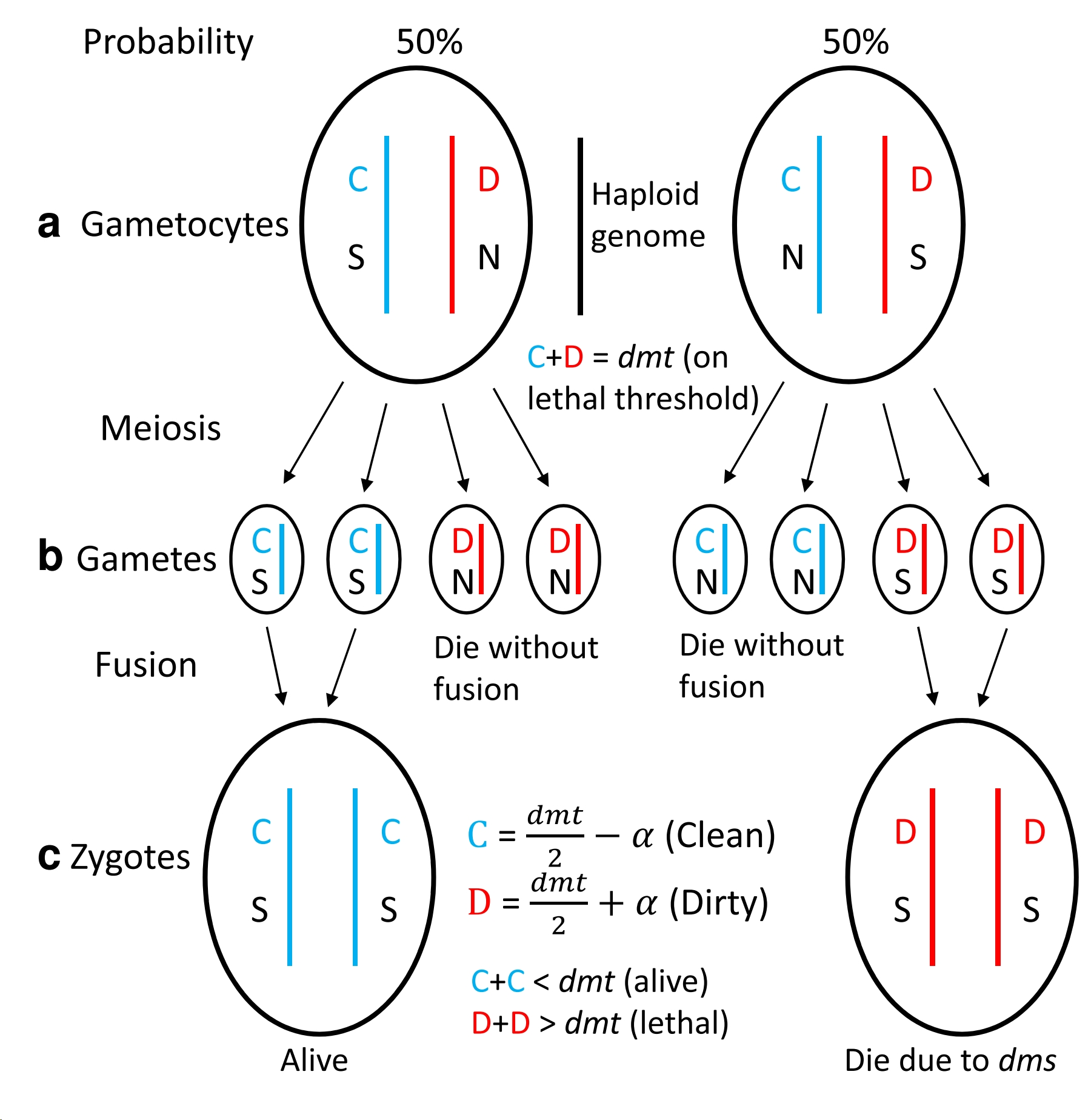
Schematic illustration of the advantage of the first sexual individual resulting from the seesaw effect. Possible combinations of the sex allele (S) and non-sex allele (N) entering the clean genome (C) or dirty genome (D) are shown. S (dominant over N) controls meiosis and fusion. α is the deviation from equal division of dms (deleterious genes) over two genomes. The first automictic selfing event is successful with a 50% probability.

In 2022, Yasui and his colleague proposed the "seesaw effect" hypothesis to explain the emergence of gametic sexual reproduction. They suggested that an ancestral diploid asexual eukaryote acquired a dominant sex allele (S), enabling meiosis and gamete fusion. As genome size increased, deleterious mutations (dms) accumulated due to Muller's ratchet, approaching a lethal threshold (dmt : e.g., 100 mutations). However, these mutations were asymmetrically distributed between the two genomes—for example, 60 mutations in one (dirty genome D) and 40 in the other (clean genome C). When the S allele arises, the cell becomes SN and undergoes meiosis, producing four gametes: two with S and two with N, split across the clean and dirty genomes (e.g., CS, CS, DN, DN or CN, CN, DS, DS). Because the first S-bearing individual had no partner, self-fertilization (automixis) occurred. Terminal fusion of sister chromatids created homozygous offspring: CS + CS produced a viable zygote with 80 mutations (40+40), while DS + DS led to 120 mutations (60+60), which exceeded dmt and resulted in death. Thus, harmful mutations were purged, and the S allele became fixed, as only S-carrying gametes could participate in fusion. DN and CN gametes (asexual types) could not fuse and died. From the second generation, each CSCS individual could produce four CS gametes, yielding two viable offspring, matching the efficiency of binary fission in asexual reproduction. Since S became fixed and all gametes could reproduce sexually, the "twofold cost of meiosis" was eliminated. This mechanism—concentrating mutational burden in some gametes while preserving others—resembled a seesaw, hence the name "seesaw effect." It explains both the origin of sex and its early evolutionary advantage in purging deleterious mutations.

== Questions ==
Some questions biologists have attempted to answer include:

- Why does sexual reproduction exist, if in many organisms it has a 50% cost (fitness disadvantage) in relation to asexual reproduction?
- Did mating types (types of gametes, according to their compatibility) arise as a result of anisogamy (gamete dimorphism), or did mating types evolve before anisogamy?
- Why do most sexual organisms use a binary mating system? Grouping itself offers a survival advantage. A binary recognition based system is the most simple and effective method in maintaining species grouping.
- Why do some organisms have gamete dimorphism?
