= Yukio Yasui =

Japanese evolutionary biologist

- 安井 行雄
- Born: 1964 (age 61–62)
- Education: Kyoto Prefectural University; Hokkaido University
- Known for: Good sperm model, evolution of gametic sex, evolutionary bet-hedging
- Notable work: Digital Encyclopedia Birdwing Butterflies
- Awards: Japan Ethological Society Prize (2018)
- Scientific career
- Fields: Evolutionary biology
- Workplaces: Kagawa University

Yukio Yasui (安井 行雄, born 1964) is a Japanese evolutionary biologist and professor at Kagawa University. He is known for theoretical and empirical work on the evolution of polyandry, gametic sexual reproduction, and evolutionary bet-hedging. Yasui’s studies combine experimental behavioural ecology with theoretical insights into reproductive strategies and environmental adaptation.

== Career ==
Yasui earned his B.Agr. and M.Agr. degrees from Kyoto Prefectural University in 1987 and 1989, and completed his Ph.D. at Hokkaido University in 1993. He served as a postdoctoral fellow at the Japan Society for the Promotion of Science (JSPS), the Japan Science and Technology Agency (JST), and the National Institute for Environmental Studies (NIES). He was also a COE Research Fellow at the Center for Ecological Research, Kyoto University, and a visiting research fellow at the University of Western Australia.

From 2000 to 2023, he was Associate Professor in the Faculty of Agriculture at Kagawa University and became a full Professor in 2024.

== Research ==
Yasui's research focuses on the evolutionary mechanisms of female multiple mating (polyandry), the origin of gametic sex and anisogamy, and adaptive strategies under environmental uncertainty.

In 1997, he proposed the "Good Sperm Model" in The American Naturalist, which suggests that females may increase offspring quality by mating with multiple males whose sperm compete for fertilization. The model is often discussed in relation to alternative sexual selection hypotheses and sperm competition theory.

He further re-evaluated the genetic benefits of polyandry in 1998 in Trends in Ecology & Evolution, emphasizing reduced sibling competition through sperm diversity.

In 2022, he co-authored a hypothesis on the evolutionary origins of gametic sexual reproduction and anisogamy in Journal of Ethology. That same year, he published a reinterpretation of evolutionary bet-hedging in Ecological Research, proposing a new framework for understanding the mean–variance trade-off of fitness in unpredictable environments.

As an experimental researcher, Yasui conducted pioneering work on sperm competition in mites by focusing on male reproductive strategies and their link with precopulatory mate-guarding behaviour. In the species Macrocheles muscaedomesticae, he found that the male mating first monopolised fertilisation and guarded females before their moult to ensure access to virgins. In contrast, in Parasitus fimetorum, mating order had no apparent effect on fertilisation success, and guarding behaviour was absent, suggesting that sperm-competition ability rather than guarding behaviour determined male reproductive success.

Through extensive field surveys carried out on foot over several tens of days, Yasui documented marked intraspecific variation in the life-history traits of the fairy shrimp Branchinella kugenumaensis within a narrow valley (~1.5 km across) of terraced rice fields in Japan. He showed that differences in water-management practices among neighbouring paddies (e.g., irrigation and drainage) led to substantial variation in water-retention duration, shrimp growth, age at maturity, and egg-laying patterns. These results later contributed to his development of an evolutionary bet-hedging framework explaining adaptive reproductive strategies under environmental unpredictability.

Yasui is also the author and editor of the 2025 open-access digital resource "Digital Encyclopedia Birdwing Butterflies" (Takashi Ohya Collection), which compiles high-resolution taxonomy, distribution, and morphology of Ornithoptera and related taxa.

== Selected publications ==
- Yasui, Y. (1988). Sperm competition of Macrocheles muscaedomesticae (Scopoli) (Acarina: Mesostigmata: Macrochelidae), with special reference to precopulatory mate-guarding behaviour. Journal of Ethology, 6, 83–90. https://doi.org/10.1007/BF02350872
- Yasui, Y. (1997). Sperm competition and the significance of female multiple mating in the predatory mite Parasitus fimetorum. Experimental and Applied Acarology, 21, 651–664. https://doi.org/10.1023/A:1018456618435
- Yasui, Y. (1997). A "good-sperm" model can explain the evolution of costly multiple mating by females. The American Naturalist, 149(3), 573–584. https://doi.org/10.1086/286006
- Yasui, Y. (1998). The genetic benefits of female multiple mating reconsidered. Trends in Ecology & Evolution, 13(6), 246–250. https://doi.org/10.1016/S0169-5347(98)01383-4
- Yasui, Y., & Garcia-Gonzalez, F. (2016). Bet-hedging as a mechanism for the evolution of polyandry, revisited. Evolution, 70(2), 385–397. https://doi.org/10.1111/evo.12847
- Yasui, Y., & Hasegawa, E. (2022). The origination events of gametic sexual reproduction and anisogamy. Journal of Ethology, 40(3), 273–284. https://doi.org/10.1007/s10164-022-00760-3
- Yasui, Y. (2022). Life-history traits of the fairy shrimp Branchinella kugenumaensis are highly variable between neighbouring rice paddies in Japan. Ecological Research, 37(3), 344–354. https://doi.org/10.1111/1440-1703.12296
- Yasui, Y. (2022). Evolutionary bet-hedging reconsidered: What is the mean–variance trade-off of fitness? Ecological Research, 37, 311–325. https://doi.org/10.1111/1440-1703.12303
- Ohya, T., & Yasui, Y. (2025). Digital Encyclopedia Birdwing Butterflies (Takashi Ohya Collection). Kagawa University Academic Repository. https://doi.org/10.57372/0002000671

== Awards ==
- Japan Ethological Society Prize (2018)
- Journal of Ethology Editor’s Choice Awards (2021–2024)
- Ecological Research Top-Cited Article Award (2024)
- Springer-Nature Research Highlights 2022 – Evolutionary Biology
- Miyadi Award, Ecological Society of Japan (2000)

== Editorial and professional service ==
Yasui served as Editor and later Chief Editor of the Journal of Ethology (2002–2016), and remains on the journal’s editorial board. He has reviewed for national grant agencies in Japan and served on the selection committee of the Japan Prize Foundation (2021–2022).
