= Weighted voting =

Electoral or law making voting system

Weighted voting are voting rules that grant some voters a greater influence than others (which contrasts with rules that assign every voter an equal vote). Such can be produced by some voters having more votes than others, as happens in plural voting, or by group of fewer voters having the same representation as a larger group of voters. It may either be intentional or a negative byproduct of the chosen electoral system.

Examples include publicly-traded companies (which typically grant stockholders one vote for each share they own), and qualified majority in the European Council, where the number of votes of each member state is roughly proportional to the square root of the population, which allows an uneven ratio of voters to members.

== Historical examples ==
=== Ancient Rome ===
The Roman assemblies provided for weighted voting after the person's tribal affiliation and social class (i.e. wealth). Rather than counting one vote per citizen, the assemblies convened in blocs (tribes or centuries), with the plurality of voters in each bloc deciding the vote of the bloc as an entity (which candidate to support or whether to favor or reject a law, for instance). Men of certain tribes and a higher social standing convened in smaller blocs, thus giving their individual vote the effect of many poor citizens' votes. In the Plebeian Council, where only the plebeians could participate, these effects were somewhat relaxed, thus making the decision to grant its decisions (called plebiscites) the full force of law controversial (Lex Hortensia in 287 BC).

=== French colonies ===
After 1946 and the Brazzaville Conference of 1944, French colonial authorities set up a system of double collège where the local population would be divided in two electoral colleges, both returning the same numbers of delegates, the first being composed by French citizens and évolués and the second by natives with indigenous status. The second group was far more numerous than the first.

This system was also used in French Algeria until 1958.

This system was abolished in 1958 with the Loi Cadre Defferre.

=== Prussia ===
The Kingdom of Prussia used an unequal electoral system from 1848 until 1918. Prussia's three-class franchise gave equal representation to three differently-sized groups of citizens.

=== Southern Rhodesia ===
Under its 1961 Constitution, the British colony of Southern Rhodesia provided for a special form of weighted voting called cross-voting. Essentially, voters were rounded up in two voters' rolls, with the A roll bearing requirements generally reached by the European-descended population, but only in a few cases by Africans. The B roll provided for many Africans and a few Europeans, but not all the adult population. Despite its limited size in terms of voters, the A roll played the major influence in electing the 65 members of parliament, which was further bolstered by the lack of support to sign up for the B roll, and its much lower turnout.

In 1969, cross-voting was abolished altogether in favor of a de jure segregationist weighted voting system, in which the A roll (electing 50 seats) was reserved for Europeans, Coloureds and Asians meeting higher property and education requirements, and the B roll (electing eight seats) reserved for Africans meeting lower property and education requirements. In its 1970 general election, about 50,000 A roll voters (essentially all white) elected 50 parliamentary seats, a little more than 1000 tribal chiefs elected eight special seats, whereas the rest of the population were to be content with the remaining eight seats.

=== Sweden ===
In Sweden, weighted voting preceded equal and universal suffrage, as well as women's suffrage. Universal and equal male suffrage to the lower house (Andra kammaren) was introduced by Arvid Lindman's first cabinet, while voting for city and county councils, which indirectly decided the composition of the upper house (Första kammaren), was graded along a 40-degree scale. Certain corporations also had votes of their own, thus multiplying the political strength of its owners. Weighted voting was abolished in Nils Eden's reforms of 1918-19, when female suffrage was also introduced.

=== Weighted voting produced by unequal districting ===
In these examples, population groups, and groups of voters, of different sizes were each represented by just one member.

New Zealand in 1881 instituted a rule that on average each rural district would be 25 percent smaller in population than each urban district. This allowed variance was decreased to 18 percent in 1887, increased to 28 percent in 1889, then finally abolished in 1945.

Manitoba when it changed from a mixed system of single transferable voting and instant-runoff voting to a purely first past the post system in 1955, instituted a rule that the population of districts would adhere to a ratio of 7 to 4, urban districts to rural districts.

== Proposed applications ==
=== Age-weighted voting ===
Academic discussions have been held regarding the potential application of weighted voting on the basis of age, particularly with the greater weighting of younger voters. Proponents argue that giving the votes of younger voters greater weight than older cohorts allows for less bias in outcome to the interests of older voters.

== Weighted voting applications ==
A weighted voting application is characterized by the players, the weights, and the quota. A player's weight (w) is the number of votes he controls. The quota (q) is the minimum number of votes required to pass a motion. Any integer is a possible choice for the quota as long as it is more than 50% of the total number of votes but is no more than 100% of the total number of votes. Each weighted voting system can be described using the generic form [q : w_{1}, w_{2}, . . ., w_{N}].

=== The notion of power ===
When considering motions, which are decided by simple passage or non-passage, reasonable electoral systems have the same outcome as majority rules. Thus, the mathematics of weighted voting systems looks at the notion of power: who has it and how much do they have? A player's power is defined as that player's ability to influence decisions.

Consider a voting structure where there are ten overall votes, 6 is the quota and players have weight of 5, 3, and 2 ([6: 5, 3, 2]). A motion can only be passed with the support of P_{1}, i.e. the 5. In this situation, P_{1} has veto power. A player is said to have veto power if a motion cannot pass without the support of that player. This does not mean a motion is guaranteed to pass with the support of that player.

In this other weighted voting structure, there are 20 overall votes, 10 is the quota and players have weight of 11, 6, and 3 ([10: 11, 6, 3]). With 11 votes, P_{1} is called a dictator. A player is typically considered a dictator if their weight is equal to or greater than the quota. The difference between a dictator and a player with veto power is that a motion is guaranteed to pass if the dictator votes in favor of it.

A dummy is any player, regardless of their weight, who has no say in the outcome of the election. A player without any say in the outcome is a player without power. Consider the weighted voting system [8: 4, 4, 2, 1]. In this voting system, the voter with weight 2 seems like he has more power than the voter with weight 1. However both voters have no power whatsoever. Neither can affect the passing of a motion. Dummies always appear in weighted voting systems that have a dictator but also occur in other weighted voting systems (the example above).

==== Measuring power ====
A player's weight is not always an accurate depiction of that player's power. Sometimes, a player with a large weight votes can have very little power, or vice versa. For example, in a weighted voting system where one voter has 51% of the weight, this voter holds all the power, even if there is another voter who has 49% of the weight.

The Banzhaf power index and the Shapley–Shubik power index provide more accurate measures of voting power, by estimating the probability that an individual voter's ballot will be decisive. Such indices often give counterintuitive results. For example, some commentators assume the United States Electoral College is weighted in favor of smaller states because it assigns every state two electoral votes over and above its House of Reperesentative seats. However, deeper analysis finds that larger states typically have more power than implied even by their more numerous electors. This makes the system as a whole biased towards larger states (unlike a simple popular vote).

== See also ==
- Apportionment in the European Parliament
- Corporatism
- Degressive proportionality
- Demeny voting
- Electoral college
- Non-citizen suffrage
- Preference voting
- Plural voting
- Prussian three-class franchise
- Vicente Blanco Gaspar
