= Parties in the European Council during 2004 =

On 1 May 2004, the European Council was substantially altered by the accession of 10 new member states.

See instead:

- Parties in the European Council between January and April 2004
- Parties in the European Council between May and December 2004
