= Parties in the Council of the European Union, 2004 =

See:

- Parties in the European Council between January and April 2004
- Parties in the European Council between May and December 2004
