= John Banzhaf =

American law professor (born 1940)

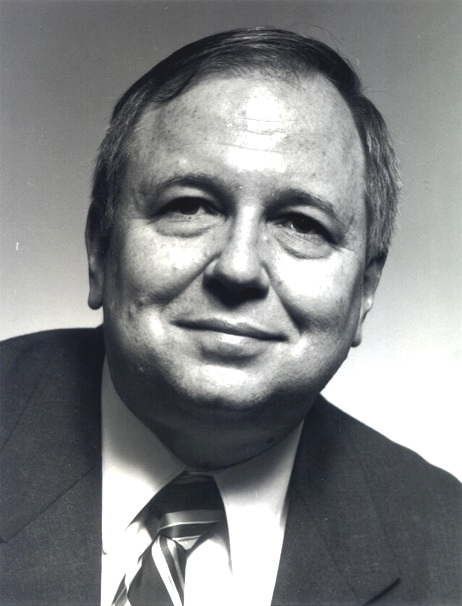
- Born: John Francis Banzhaf III; July 2, 1940 (age 86); New York City
- Education: BSEE, JD
- Alma mater: Stuyvesant High School; Massachusetts Institute of Technology; Columbia University Law School
- Occupation: Professor
- Employer: George Washington University Law School
- Known for: litigation
- Website: banzhaf.net

John Francis Banzhaf III (/ˈbænz.hɑːf/; born July 2, 1940) is an American public interest lawyer, legal activist, and law professor at the George Washington University Law School. He is the founder of an antismoking advocacy group, Action on Smoking and Health. He is noted for his advocacy and use of lawsuits as a method to promote what he believes is the public interest.

== Life and education ==
Banzhaf was born July 2, 1940, in New York City. He graduated at the age of 15 from Manhattan's Stuyvesant High School, one of the three academically elite high schools of the New York City Public School System. He went on to graduate from the Massachusetts Institute of Technology with a Bachelor of Science in Electrical Engineering and from Columbia Law School with a Juris Doctor.

== Contributions to law and public policy ==
=== Freddie Gray complaint ===
Banzhaf filed a complaint with the Maryland's Attorney Grievance Commission against Prosecutor Marilyn Mosby, the state's attorney of Baltimore, saying she did not have probable cause to charge six officers in the death of Freddie Gray, and also that she repeatedly withheld evidence from the officers' defense attorneys. He compared her to Mike Nifong and his handling of the Duke lacrosse case.

=== Copyright of computer software ===
Banzhaf got an early start in legal advocacy. While still a student in law school, he was assigned to research and draft a note for the Columbia Law Review on whether computer programs and other software could be protected under U.S. copyright law. The United States Patent Office had previously declined to grant any patents on software, and no computer program copyrights had ever been recognized. As part of his research, Banzhaf sought to register copyrights on two programs he had written: one in printed form, and the other recorded on magnetic tape. In 1964, the United States Copyright Office registered two copyrights of Banzhaf, thereby recognizing for the first time the validity of this new form of legal protection.

One year later, he testified at a congressional hearing at which he urged, ultimately successfully, that the long-awaited revision of US copyright law should expressly recognize computer and data processing issues.

=== Measuring the power of voting blocs in a committee ===
Banzhaf studied the Nassau County Board's voting system, which allocated the total of 30 votes to its municipalities as follows:

- Hempstead #1: 9
- Hempstead #2: 9
- North Hempstead: 7
- Oyster Bay: 3
- Glen Cove: 1
- Long Beach: 1

A simple majority of 16 votes sufficed to win a vote.

In Banzhaf's notation, [Hempstead #1, Hempstead #2, North Hempstead, Oyster Bay, Glen Cove, Long Beach] are A-F in [16; 9, 9, 7, 3, 1, 1]

There are 32 winning coalitions, and 48 swing votes:

AB AC BC ABC ABD ABE ABF ACD ACE ACF BCD BCE BCF ABCD ABCE ABCF ABDE ABDF ABEF ACDE ACDF ACEF BCDE BCDF BCEF ABCDE ABCDF ABCEF ABDEF ACDEF BCDEF ABCDEF

Banzhaf proposed an index, now known as the "Banzhaf index", to measure the power of each municipality:

- Hempstead #1 = 1/3
- Hempstead #2 = 1/3
- North Hempstead = 1/3
- Oyster Bay = 0
- Glen Cove = 0
- Long Beach = 0

Banzhaf argued that a voting arrangement that gives zero power to one-sixth of the county's population is unfair and sued the board. The Banzhaf power index has been used as a way to measure voting power, along with the Shapley–Shubik power index.

=== Teaching ===
Banzhaf has used a clinical-project format in some of his law classes, rather than a more traditional lecture and academic study format. Students are divided into teams and asked to work on some genuine consumer problems.

One of the students' high-profile projects was a suit against former Vice-President Spiro Agnew seeking to force Agnew to repay the bribes he accepted while Governor of Maryland. Agnew was ordered to repay the state the $147,500 in kickbacks, with interest of $101,235, for a total of $248,735. The project was started in 1976 by three students in Banzhaf's class on public interest law. The students recruited three Maryland residents to carry the suit.

Another case that attracted much attention targeted the McDonald's restaurant chain. One of Banzhaf's students, James Pizzirusso, successfully sued McDonald's in 2001 for precooking their French fries in beef fat and not warning vegetarians and beef avoiders about it; in 2002, Pizzirusso won a class-action settlement of $12.5 million.

Five students in Banzhaf’s public interest law class took on an environmental case that set U.S. Supreme Court precedent on “standing” in 1973, persisting for over 50 years. United States v. Students Challenging Regulatory Agency Procedures (SCRAP) was also the first full court consideration of the National Environmental Policy Act (NEPA). In December 1971, the students, led by SCRAP chair and third-year student Neil Thomas Proto, filed a petition with the Interstate Commerce Commission (ICC) seeking a $1 billion refund for the failure of the commission to comply with NEPA. The students argued that the ICC failed to comply with NEPA in approving a 20 percent railroad freight rate increase that the students claimed discriminated against the movement of recyclable materials by favoring the movement of raw materials.

=== Tobacco ===
Much of Banzhaf's tobacco work has been done through the Action on Smoking and Health, a nonprofit he founded in 1967.

==== Television advertising ====
In late 1966, John Banzhaf asked a local television station, WCBS-TV, to provide air time for announcements against smoking. The station refused, so Banzhaf filed a complaint with the Federal Communications Commission (FCC) in 1967. The FCC's fairness doctrine required broadcasters to provide free air time to opposing views of matters of public controversy. In his complaint, Banzhaf argued that tobacco advertisements were broadcasting only pro-smoking messages; he argued that, as a public service, the broadcasters should be required to show an equal number of anti-smoking messages.

On June 2, 1967, the FCC announced its decision that its fairness doctrine applied to the request for anti-smoking announcements. The FCC stated that the public should hear an anti-smoking viewpoint. However, the FCC required only the ratio of one anti-smoking message for each four cigarette advertisements (not the one-to-one ratio suggested by Banzhaf).

The tobacco industry appealed against this decision, but it was upheld by the United States Court of Appeals, and the United States Supreme Court declined to hear the case. "Various governmental and voluntary health organizations made extremely creative spots and provided them to stations." In response, tobacco companies offered to stop all advertising on television, if this coordinated action was granted immunity from antitrust laws; they further agreed to have warning labels on cigarette packages and advertising. Tobacco ads ceased to appear on television in the United States at the end of 1970 (on January 1, 1971). Cigarette advertising shifted to print media. Consequently, anti-smoking announcements were no longer required to satisfy the FCC's fairness doctrine.

==== Passive smoking ====
In the late 1960s, Banzhaf and the Action on Smoking and Health worked against passive smoking. In 1969, Ralph Nader had petitioned the Federal Aviation Administration to ban smoking on all flights, when Banzhaf petitioned the FAA to require separate smoking and nonsmoking sections on domestic flights. Nader's petition and Banzhaf's petition each failed to change FAA policies, because passive smoking had not yet been recognized as a serious health hazard.

In 1972, both Nader and Banzhaf filed petitions with the Civil Aeronautics Board, which largely granted their petitions. However, many airlines failed fully to comply with the regulations. The Action on Smoking and Health sued the CAB in 1979, claiming that legally mandated enforcement was inadequate. When the Reagan administration came into office in 1981, it weakened enforcement of the previous CAB rules.

=== Obesity ===
In the early 2000s, Banzhaf has focused his efforts against obesity, following the 2001 Surgeon General's report on obesity. In particular, Banzhaf has criticized the contracts for soft drink machines in schools and McDonald's, alleging that both have helped to contribute to childhood obesity.

In 2003, Banzhaf began criticizing "pouring rights" contracts, which he called "Cokes for Kickbacks" contracts. Under these contracts with school districts, soft drink companies place vending machines in schools; the districts receive a commission on the sales. Banzhaf has written that such contracts have increased soft-drink consumption and thereby contributed to the epidemic of childhood obesity.

In his advocacy against childhood obesity, Banzhaf has criticized McDonald's. In 2002, he filed a lawsuit claiming product liability against McDonald's, claiming that false advertising by McDonald's contributes to childhood obesity. Obesity and McDonald's were discussed in the 2004 film Super Size Me by Morgan Spurlock, in which Banzhaf is repeatedly interviewed. In one scene, Spurlock and Banzhaf have a discussion while eating at McDonald's. In his 2005 book, Spurlock quoted Banzhaf's explanation of why litigious campaigns have had more success than legislative campaigns:

The problem of passing litigation over the objections of a very powerful industry with a big pocketbook is exactly what we faced with Big Tobacco and smoking. ... I and every one of the attorneys and public health experts I'm working with would much rather see this go through legislation then [sic] litigation. Our motto is, "If the legislators don't legislate, then the litigators will litigate."

=== Politics ===
Banzhaf filed a complaint with the Maryland's Attorney Grievance Commission against Prosecutor Marilyn Mosby, the state's attorney of Baltimore, saying she did not have probable cause to charge six officers in the death of Freddie Gray, and also that she repeatedly withheld evidence from the officers' defense attorneys. He compared her to Mike Nifong and his handling of the Duke lacrosse case.

==== Richard Nixon ====
Banzhaf filed a motion requesting that the federal government appoint a special prosecutor to investigate the role of the White House in what became known as the Watergate scandal. American University history professor Allan Lichtman stated that Banzhaf "was the first to seriously raise the issue in a public way. He certainly put it in the minds of members of Congress and was a contributing factor," despite that the motion was denied, in establishing a path for the appointment of future special prosecutors, which then led to the resignation of Richard Nixon.

==== Spiro Agnew ====
Following publication his memoir, Go Quietly, former vice president Spiro Agnew gave a rare television interview in 1980, after which Banzhaf's students located three Maryland residents, who sought to have Agnew pay the state $268,482, in repayment for kickbacks that he was alleged to have received while in office. In 1981, a judge ruled that "Mr. Agnew had no lawful right to this money under any theory," and ordered restitution as $147,500 in bribes and $101,235 in interest. After two unsuccessful appeals by Agnew, he finally paid the sum in 1983. In 1989, Agnew applied unsuccessfully for this sum to be treated as tax deductible.

==== Donald Trump ====
In December 2020, complaints written to Georgia state authorities by Banzhaf charged that, while President of the United States, Donald Trump appeared to violate three Georgia penal codes during a leaked and subsequently widely publicized phone call of January 2, 2021, with Georgia Secretary of State Brad Raffensperger. Banzhaf cited Conspiracy to Commit Election Fraud (§ 21-2-603), Criminal Solicitation to Commit Election Fraud (§ 21-2-604), and Intentional Interference With Performance of Election Duties (§ 21-2-597) during the January 2, 2021 call; the complaints resulted in two criminal investigations by the Fulton County district attorney.

== Criticisms ==
Banzhaf's advocacy has drawn criticism. In 2006, Ezra Levant wrote in the National Post, "Banzhaf was the health-law strategist who destroyed the concept of personal responsibility when it came to smoking."

Addressing the charge that his legal campaigns and victories have reduced personal responsibility, according to the Hartford Courant, Banzhaf replied with a rhetorical question:

Is there a sudden loss of personal responsibility? No—because we would see it in other areas: sudden increases in drunkenness, teenage pregnancy, drug abuse deaths. Clearly there is no decline in personal responsibility.

Banzhaf was criticized for his 2011 lawsuits and Human Rights charges against the Catholic University of America (CUA). The first was a gender-discrimination lawsuit in response to President John H. Garvey's decision to implement same sex dorms on campus. Later in 2011, Banzhaf filed a complaint with the DC Office of Human Rights claiming Muslim students were being discriminated against because of lack of adequate prayer space. According to Banzhaf, the charge came as a response to a 2010 article in CUA's student newspaper about Muslim students at CUA, in which no complaints were made.

Adrian Brune wrote in American Lawyer (2005) that Banzhaf had had conflicts with the Frontiers of Freedom Institute, which operated a website, banzhafwatch.com, with the slogan "Keeping an eye on the man who wants to sue America," until mid-2006. Reason, a libertarian magazine, published a critical article by Charles Paul Freund in 2002. Writer Richard Kluger criticized Banzhaf's leadership of the Action on Smoking and Health.

== See also ==
- Potty parity
