= Parties in the European Council during 2001 =

European council 2001

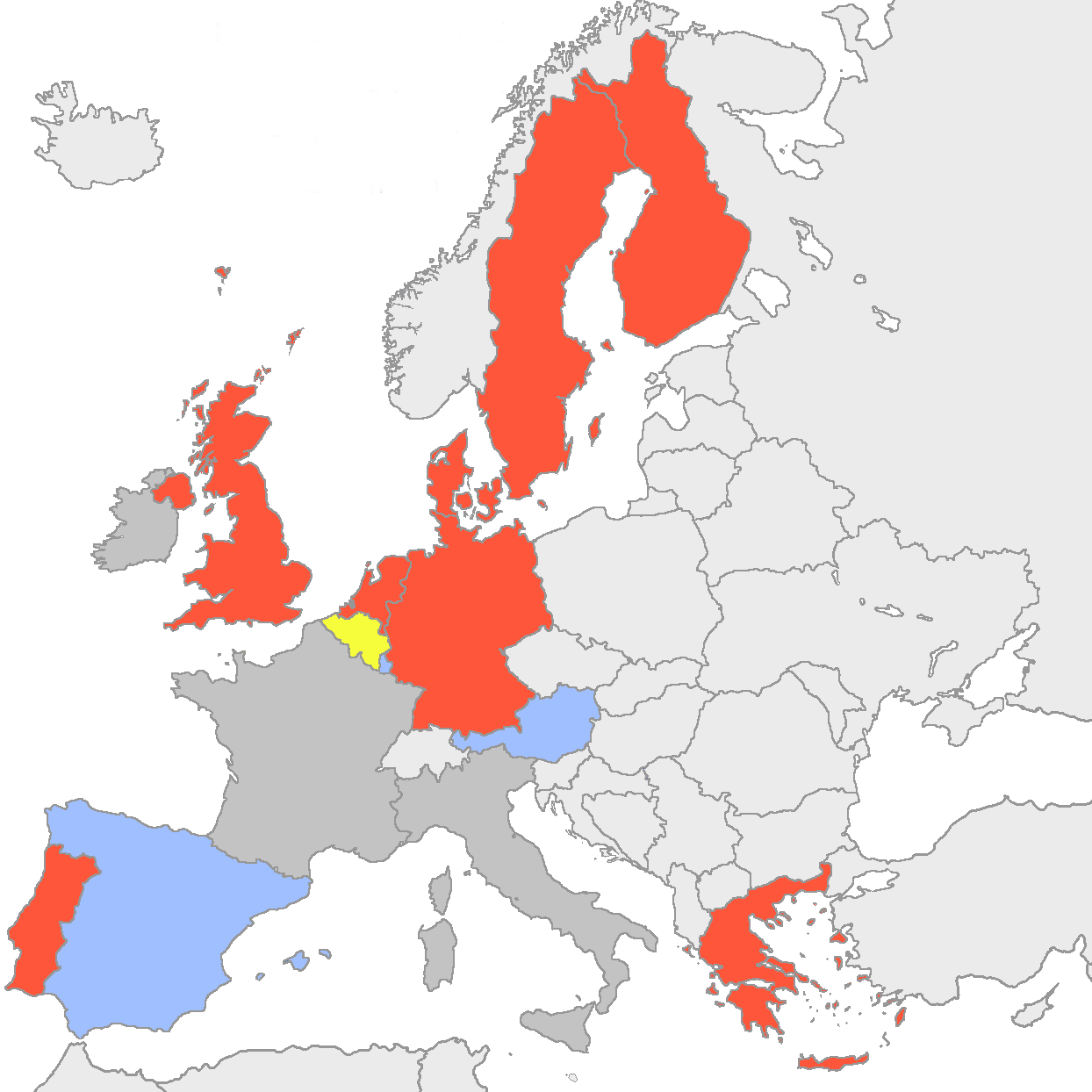
The member-states of the European Union by the European party affiliations of their leaders, as of 1 January 2001.

This article describes the party affiliations of the leaders of each member-state represented in the European Council during the year 2001. The list below gives the political party that each head of government, or head of state, belonged to at the national level, as well as the European political alliance to which that national party belonged. The states are listed from most to least populous. More populous states have greater influence in the council, in accordance with the system of Qualified Majority Voting.

== Summary ==
Party	1 January 2001		11 June 2001		27 November 2001		6 December 2001
Party	#	QMV	#	QMV	#	QMV	#	QMV
Party of European Socialists	8	45	8	45	7	42	7	42
Independent	3	23	2	13	2	13	1	3
European People's Party	3	14	4	24	4	24	5	34
European Liberal Democrat and Reform Party	1	5	1	5	2	8	2	8

== List of leaders (1 January 2001) ==
Member-state	Votes	Leader	National party	European party
Germany	10	Gerhard Schröder	SPD	PES
France	10	Jacques Chirac	RPR	Independent
United Kingdom	10	Tony Blair	Lab	PES
Italy	10	Giuliano Amato	Independent
Spain	8	José María Aznar	PP	EPP
Netherlands	5	Wim Kok	PvdA	PES
Greece	5	Costas Simitis	PA.SO.K.	PES
Belgium	5	Guy Verhofstadt	VLD	ELDR
Portugal	5	António Guterres	PS	PES
Sweden	4	Göran Persson	SAP	PES
Austria	4	Wolfgang Schüssel	ÖVP	EPP
Denmark	3	Poul Nyrup Rasmussen	A	PES
Finland	3	Paavo Lipponen	SDP	PES
Ireland	3	Bertie Ahern	FF	Independent
Luxembourg	2	Jean-Claude Juncker	CSV	EPP

== Changes ==
=== Affiliation ===
Date	Member-state	Leader	National party	European party
11 June	Italy	Silvio Berlusconi	FI	EPP
27 November	Denmark	Anders Fogh Rasmussen	V	ELDR
6 December	France	Jacques Chirac	RPR	EPP

– Rally for the Republic, which held office under Jacques Chirac, became an EPP member.

== See also ==
- Presidency of the Council of the European Union
