= Authority distribution =

Authority distribution is a solution concept in cooperative game theory formulated by Lloyd Shapley and his doctoral student Xingwei Hu in 2003 to measure the authority and power of players in well-defined hierarchical organizations. The concept provides a mathematical framework for quantifying how decision-making authority is distributed among individuals or units within hierarchical structures. Authority distribution generates the Shapley-Shubik power index as a special case and extends its application to more complex organizational settings.

The theory builds upon Shapley's earlier work on the Shapley value, which earned him the Nobel Memorial Prize in Economic Sciences in 2012. Authority distribution can be used for ranking, strategic planning, and organizational design, providing quantitative insights into optimal decision-making structures and delegation of authority.

Unlike traditional power indices, which primarily focus on voting systems, authority distribution models the nuanced relationships between superiors and subordinates in hierarchical organizations. This makes it particularly valuable for analyzing complex structures where authority flows through multiple levels.

== Definition ==
The organization contracts each individual by boss and approval relation with others. So each individual has its own authority structure, called command game. The Shapley-Shubik power index for these command games are collectively denoted by a power transit matrix Ρ.

The authority distribution π is defined as the solution to the counterbalance equation π=πΡ. The basic idea for the counterbalance equation is that a person's power comes from his critical roles in others' command game; on the other hand, his power could also be redistributed to those who sit in his command game as vital players.

For a simple legislative body, π is simply the Shapley-Shubik power index, based on a probabilistic argument.

== Applications ==
Example 1. College ranking by applicants’ acceptance

Suppose that there are large numbers of college applicants to apply the colleges Each applicant files multiple applications. Each college then offers some of its applicants admissions and rejects all others. Now some applicants may get no offer from any college; the others then get one offer or multiple offers. An applicant with multiple offers will decide which college to go to and reject all other colleges which make offers to him. Of all applicants who apply to and receive offers from College i, we let P(i,j) be the proportion of those applicants who decide to go to college j. Such applicants of course apply to and receive offers from College j as well.

To rank the colleges by the acceptance rates of the applicants to whom offers were made, we can apply the authority distribution associated with the matrix P. The so-called “authority distribution” can be regarded as the measure of relative attractiveness of the colleges from the applicants’ point of view.

Example 2. Journal rankings by citations

Assume there are n journals in a scientific field. For any Journal i, each issue contains many papers, and each paper has its list of references or citations. A paper in journal j can be cited in another paper in Journal i as a reference. Of all papers cited by Journal i (repetition counted), we let P(i,j) be the proportion of those papers which are published on Journal j. So P measures the direct impact between any two journals and P(i, i) is the self-citation rate for Journal i . The authority distribution for π = πP would quantify the long-term influence of each journal in the group of journals and can be used to rank these journals.

Example 3. Planning of a freeway system

A few small towns believe that building a freeway system would be to their common benefit. Say, they plan to build freeways F1, F2, ..., Fn−1. We let Fn be the existing traffic channels of car, truck and bus. We assume that all the potential freeways have the same length. Otherwise we can make up the assumption by dividing long freeways into smaller segments and rename them all. The freeways with higher traffic intensity should be built with more driving lanes and so receive more investments. Of all the traffic flow on Fi, we let P(i,j) be the (estimated) proportion of the traffic flowing into Fj. Then the authority distribution π satisfying π = πP will measure the relative traffic intensity on each Fi and can be used in the investment allocation.

A similar issue can be found in designing an Internet or Intranet system.

Example 4. Real Effective Exchange Rates Weights

Assume there are n countries. Let P(i,j) be country j's weights of consumption of country's total production. The associated π measures the weights in the trading system of n countries.

Example 5. Sort Big Data Objects by Revealed Preference

When ranking big data observations, diverse consumers reveal heterogeneous preferences; but any revealed preference is a ranking between two observations, derived from a consumer’s rational consideration of many factors. Previous researchers have applied exogenous weighting and multivariate regression approaches, and spatial, network, or multidimensional analyses to sort complicated objects, ignoring the variety and variability of the objects. By recognizing the diversity and heterogeneity among both the observations and the consumers, Hu (2000) instead applies endogenous weighting to these contradictory revealed preferences. The outcome is a consistent steady-state solution to the counterbalance equilibrium within these contradictions. The solution takes into consideration the spillover effects of multiple-step interactions among the observations. When information from data is efficiently revealed in preferences, the revealed preferences greatly reduce the volume of the required data in the sorting process.

== See also ==
- Shapley value
- Shapley-Shubik power index
- Banzhaf power index
