= Parties in the European Council between July and December 2013 =

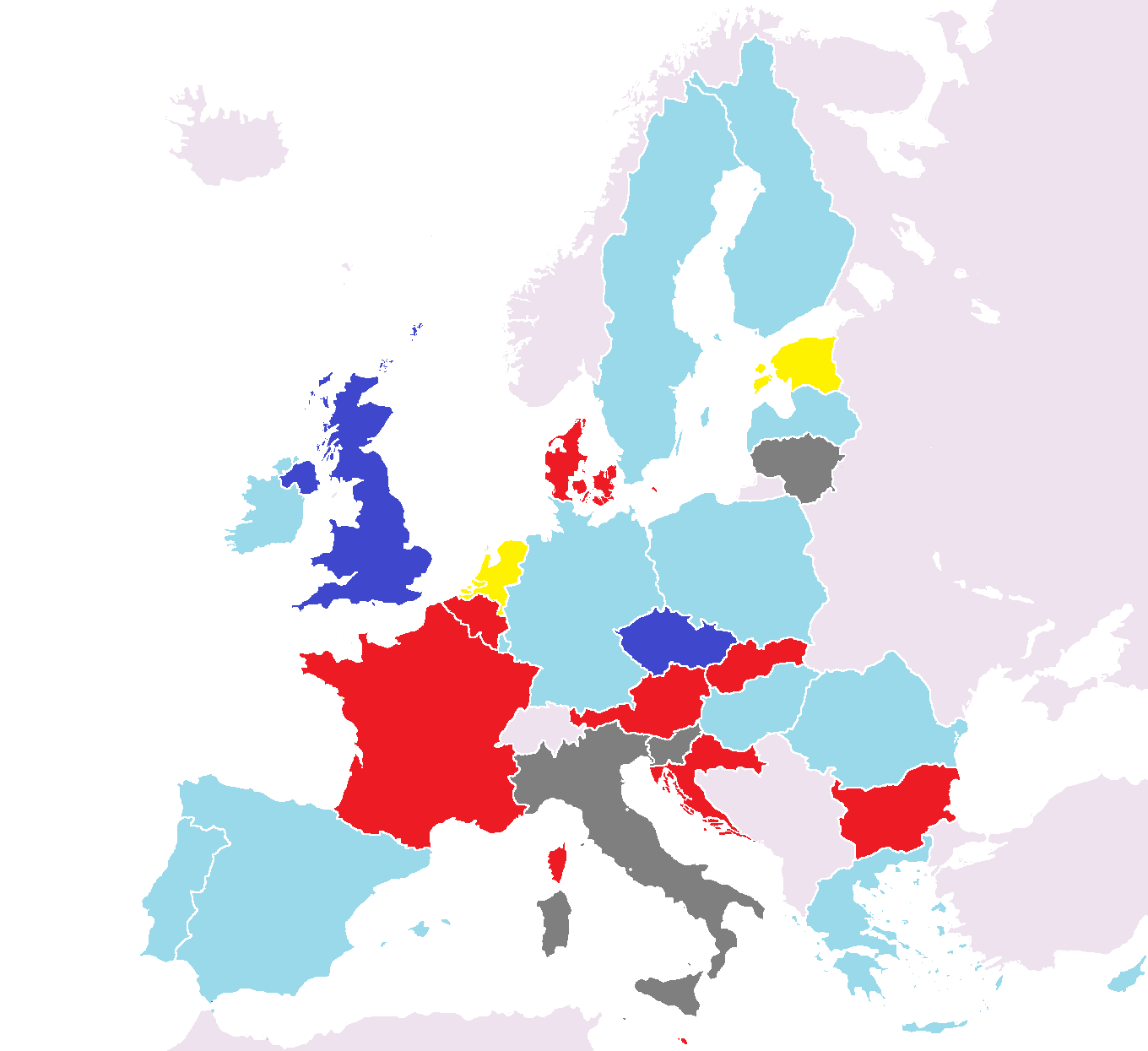
The member-states of the European Union by the European party affiliations of their leaders, as of 1 July 2013.

On 1 July 2013, Croatia became the 28th member state of the European Union. This resulted in change of the influence each member state has, as well as its Qualified Majority Voting. This article describes the party affiliations of leaders of each member-state represented in the European Council during the year 2013. The list below gives the political party that each head of government, or head of state, belongs to at the national level, as well as the European political alliance to which that national party belongs. The states are listed from most to least populous. More populous states have greater influence in the council, in accordance with the system of Qualified Majority Voting.

== Summary ==
| Party | 1 July 2013 | | 10 July 2013 | | 4 December 2013 |
| Party | # | QMV | # | QMV | # | QMV |
|---|---|---|---|---|---|---|
| European People's Party | 13 | 169 | 13 | 169 | 12 | 165 |
| Party of European Socialists | 8 | 85 | 8 | 85 | 8 | 85 |
| Alliance of European Conservatives and Reformists | 2 | 41 | 1 | 29 | 1 | 29 |
| Independent | 3 | 40 | 4 | 52 | 4 | 52 |
| Alliance of Liberals and Democrats for Europe Party | 2 | 17 | 2 | 17 | 3 | 21 |

== List of leaders (1 July 2013) ==
| Member-state | Votes | Leader | National party | European party |
|---|---|---|---|---|
| Germany | 29 | Angela Merkel | CDU | EPP |
| France | 29 | François Hollande | PS | PES |
| United Kingdom | 29 | David Cameron | Con | AECR |
| Italy | 29 | Enrico Letta | PD | Independent |
| Spain | 27 | Mariano Rajoy | PP | EPP |
| Poland | 27 | Donald Tusk | PO | EPP |
| Romania | 14 | Traian Băsescu | Independent | EPP |
| Netherlands | 13 | Mark Rutte | VVD | ALDE Party |
| Greece | 12 | Antonis Samaras | ND | EPP |
| Belgium | 12 | Elio Di Rupo | PS | PES |
| Portugal | 12 | Pedro Passos Coelho | PPD/PSD | EPP |
| Czech Republic | 12 | Petr Nečas | ODS | AECR |
| Hungary | 12 | Viktor Orbán | Fidesz | EPP |
| Sweden | 10 | Fredrik Reinfeldt | M | EPP |
| Austria | 10 | Werner Faymann | SPÖ | PES |
| Bulgaria | 10 | Plamen Oresharski | Independent | PES (Note: PES General Secretary Achim Post stated that; “the PES sends the warmest congratulations to the BSP on the formation of the new Government in Bulgaria. Plamen Oresharski becomes the tenth PES head of State or Government in the European Council" although not member of BSP. See the PES press release: "New Bulgarian Government will be one with an irreproachable sense of integrity, responsibility and urgency, says Sergei Stanishev".) |
| Denmark | 7 | Helle Thorning-Schmidt | A | PES |
| Slovakia | 7 | Robert Fico | SMER-SD | PES |
| Finland | 7 | Jyrki Katainen | Kok. | EPP |
| Ireland | 7 | Enda Kenny | FG | EPP |
| Croatia | 7 | Zoran Milanović | SDP | PES |
| Lithuania | 7 | Dalia Grybauskaitė | Independent |
| Slovenia | 4 | Alenka Bratušek | PS | Independent |
| Latvia | 4 | Valdis Dombrovskis | V | EPP |
| Estonia | 4 | Andrus Ansip | RE | ALDE Party |
| Cyprus | 4 | Nicos Anastasiades | DISY | EPP |
| Luxembourg | 4 | Jean-Claude Juncker | CSV | EPP |
| Malta | 3 | Joseph Muscat | PL | PES |

Supported by PD-L

== Changes ==
=== Affiliation ===
| Date | Member-state | Leader | National party | European party |
| 10 July | Czech Republic | Jiří Rusnok | Independent |
| 4 December | Luxembourg | Xavier Bettel | DP | ALDE Party |

=== Office-holder only ===
| Date | Member-state | Leader | National party | European party |

== See also ==
- Presidency of the Council of the European Union
