= Apportionment in the European Parliament =

Allocation of legislative seats to EU member countries

The apportionment of seats within the European Parliament to each member state of the European Union is set out by the EU treaties. According to European Union treaties, the distribution of seats is "degressively proportional" to the population of the member states, with negotiations and agreements between member states playing a role. Thus the allocation of seats is not strictly proportional to the size of a state's population, nor does it reflect any other automatically triggered or fixed mathematical formula. The process can be compared to the composition of the electoral college used to elect the President of the United States of America in that, pro rata, the smaller state received more places in the electoral college than the more populous states.

After the withdrawal of the United Kingdom from the EU in 2020, the number of MEPs, including the president, dropped to 705 but since the 2024 election, it increased to 720. The maximum number allowed by the Lisbon Treaty is 751.

== Background ==
When the Parliament was established in 1952 as the 78-member "Common Assembly of the European Coal and Steel Community" the then-three smaller states (Belgium, Luxembourg, and the Netherlands) were concerned about being under-represented and hence they were granted more seats than their population would have allowed. Membership increased to 142 with the Assembly expanded to cover the Economic and Atomic Energy Communities. It then grew further with each enlargement, which each time allowing smaller nations to have greater proportion of seats relative to larger states.

Relative influence of voters from different EU member states (2024–2029)

Influence is proportional to seats-to-votes ratio and inversely proportional to Inhabitants to MEPs ratio.

Member state	Population (2026)	MEPs	Inhabitants per MEP	Influence
Austria	9,215,956	20	460,798	1.36
Belgium	11,955,308	22	543,423	1.16
Bulgaria	6,423,207	17	377,836	1.66
Croatia	3,874,350	12	322,863	1.94
Cyprus	996,571	6	166,095	3.78
Czech Republic	10,915,839	21	519,802	1.21
Denmark	6,025,603	15	401,707	1.56
Estonia	1,360,745	7	194,392	3.23
Finland	5,652,881	15	376,859	1.67
France	69,112,309	81	853,238	0.74
Germany	83,467,117	96	869,449	0.72
Greece	10,366,586	21	493,647	1.27
Hungary	9,488,428	21	451,830	1.39
Ireland	5,510,565	14	393,612	1.59
Italy	58,942,828	76	775,564	0.81
Latvia	1,845,096	9	205,011	3.06
Lithuania	2,887,592	11	262,508	2.39
Luxembourg	690,959	6	115,160	5.45
Malta	588,254	6	98,042	6.40
Netherlands	18,130,208	31	584,845	1.07
Poland	36,332,765	53	685,524	0.92
Portugal	11,424,031	21	544,001	1.15
Romania	19,041,322	33	577,010	1.09
Slovakia	5,409,407	15	360,627	1.74
Slovenia	2,135,107	9	237,234	2.65
Spain	49,590,099	61	812,952	0.77
Sweden	10,605,529	21	505,025	1.24
European Union	451,990,314	720	627,764	1.00

== Nice system (2003–2009) ==
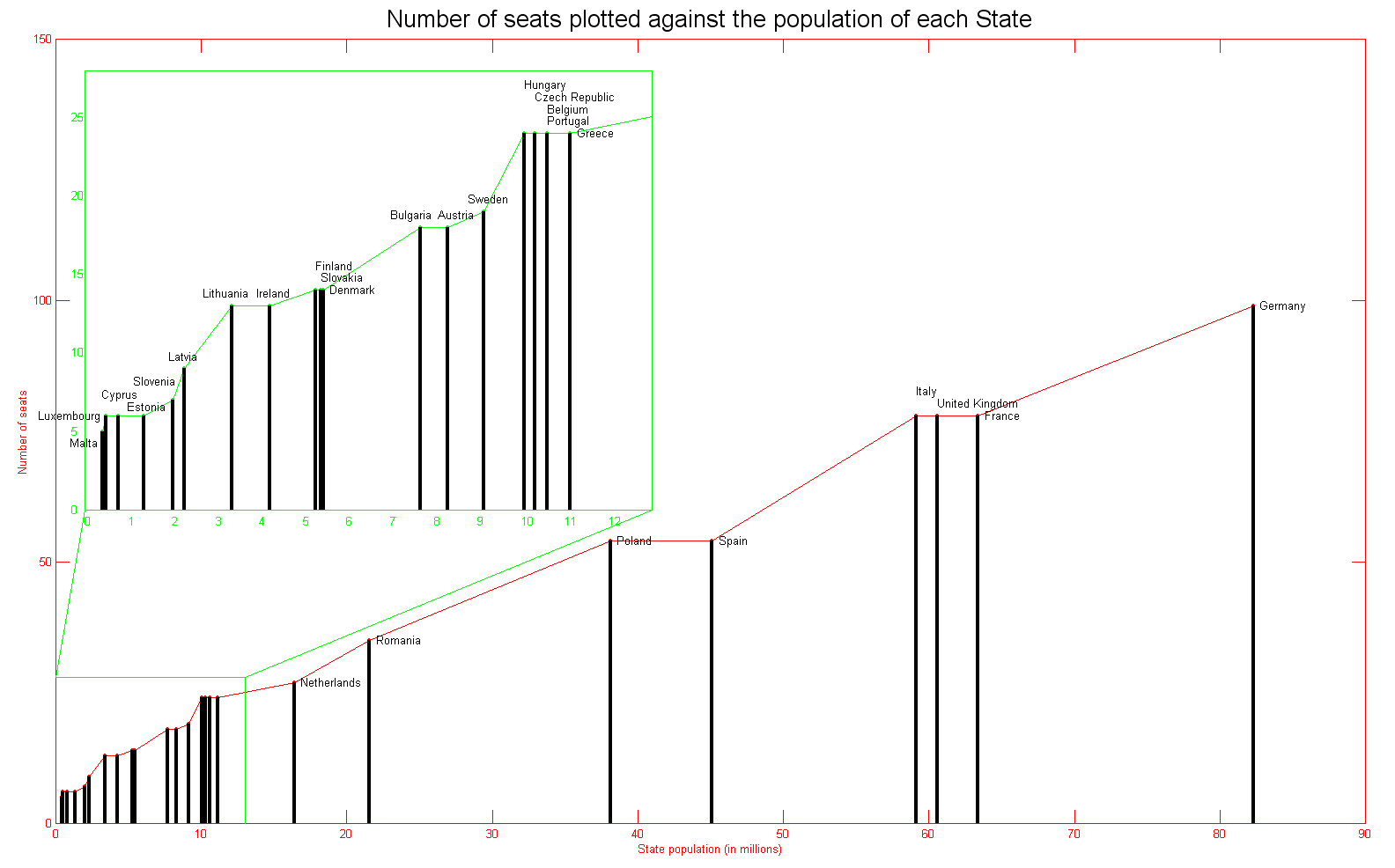
Number of seats plotted against the population of each state (Nice 2007)

The Nice Treaty provided for a maximum of 736 seats. In 2009, with about 500 million EU citizens, this meant that there were on average 670,000 citizens represented by each MEP. Some states divide the electorate for their allocated MEPs into sub-national constituencies. However, they may not be divided in such a way that the system would no longer be proportional.

The 2004 European Parliament election was the first conducted under the Nice Treaty, with 732 seats for the 25 member states.

The 2009 European Parliament election was conducted under the rules included in the Nice Treaty which provided for a maximum number of 736, although that figure had been breached on the accession of new members to the EU, these states being allowed parliamentary representation without a corresponding reduction in the number of MEPs allotted to other member states. This happened in 2007 on the accession of Romania and Bulgaria, when the number of seats temporarily increased to 785. It subsequently returned to 736 in the 2009 election.

== Lisbon system (2009–present) ==
Under the Lisbon Treaty, which first applied to the 2014 European Parliament election, the cap on the number of seats was raised to 750, with a maximum of 96 and a minimum of 6 seats per state. They continue to be distributed "degressively proportional" to the populations of the EU's member states.

European Parliament apportionment changes between the Treaty of Nice and the Treaty of Lisbon (as calculated for purposes of the 2009 European elections)
Member state	2007 Nice	2009 Nice	2014 Lisbon	2014 (Note: As proposed by European Parliament on 13 March 2013.) + Croatia
Germany	99	99	96	96
France	78	72	74	74
United Kingdom (Note: Included Gibraltar, but not any other BOT (including the SBAs), nor the Crown Dependencies. The United Kingdom and Gibraltar left the European Union on 31 January 2020.)	78	72	73	73
Italy	78	72	73	73
Spain	54	50	54	54
Poland	54	50	51	51
Romania	35	33	33	32
Netherlands	27	25	26	26
Belgium	24	22	22	21
Czech Republic	24	22	22	21
Greece	24	22	22	21
Hungary	24	22	22	21
Portugal	24	22	22	21
Sweden	19	18	20	20
Austria	18	17	19	18
Bulgaria	18	17	18	17
Finland	14	13	13	13
Denmark	14	13	13	13
Slovakia	14	13	13	13
Croatia	–	–	–	11
Ireland	13	12	12	11
Lithuania	13	12	12	11
Latvia	9	8	9	8
Slovenia	7	7	8	8
Cyprus	6	6	6	6
Estonia	6	6	6	6
Luxembourg	6	6	6	6
Malta	5	5	6	6
Total:	785	736	751 (Note: The speaker is not counted officially, thus leaving 750 MEPs.)	751
Italicised countries are divided into sub-national constituencies, except France which changed to full-country voting in 2019.

There was controversy over the fact that the population figures are based on residents, not citizens, resulting in countries with larger disenfranchised immigrant populations gaining more under Lisbon than those with smaller ones. Italy would have been the greatest loser under the Lisbon system and sought the same number of MEPs as France and the United Kingdom. Italy raised the issue during treaty negotiations and succeeded in gaining one extra MEP (giving it the same as the UK) while the President of the European Parliament would not be counted as a lawmaker hence keeping the number of MEPs to the 750-seat limit.

=== 2011 amendment ===
In 2011 an amendment, which came into force on 1 December, temporarily increased the Lisbon limit to 754. This allowed member states who gained seats under Lisbon to take them before the 2014 election, while allowing Germany which lost seats under Lisbon to retain them until the 2014 election. This amendment, in effect, institutes a transitional manner of distributing MEPs to take account of the fact that the 2009 European Parliamentary elections took place under the rules contained in the Nice Treaty and not in the Lisbon Treaty. That result means that member state that are to gain seats in parliament under the Lisbon rules may take them, but that Germany which loses three seats under the Lisbon rules keeps those seats until the next elections, due in 2014. As a result, Germany temporarily exceeds the maximum number of MEPs allocatable to a member state under the Lisbon Treaty by having 99 MEPs, three above the intended limit.

=== 2013 amendment ===
Following the accession of Croatia on 1 July 2013 with 12 extra seats, the apportionment was amended for the 2014 elections, when 12 countries lost one seat (including Croatia itself).

=== 2014 election ===
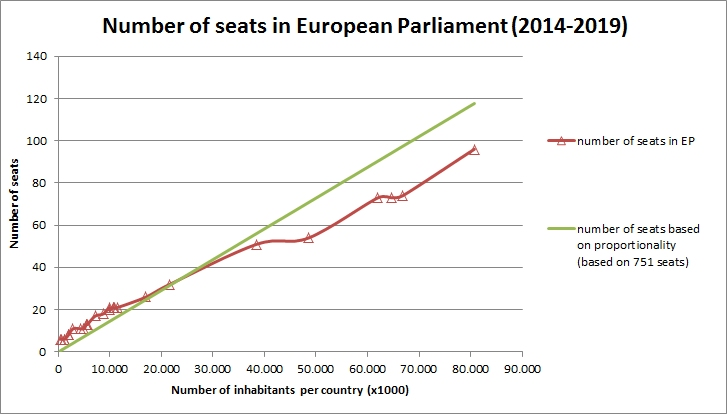
Number of seats in EP 2014–2019 versus number of inhabitants, showing difference with proportionality

From October 2008, MEP Andrew Duff (ALDE, UK) has advocated within the European Parliament for a reform of EU electoral law for the 2014 elections, including the creation of a single constituency of 25 seats in which each European citizen would be entitled to vote on the basis of pan-European lists. He has been nominated rapporteur, as the European Parliament has the right of initiative in this field ruled by unanimity in the Council. After the 2009 election, Duff proposed a new version of his report, which was adopted by the parliamentary Committee on Constitutional Affairs (AFCO) in April 2011. However, the plenary session of the Parliament referred the report back to the AFCO committee in July 2011. A third version of the report was published in September 2011 and adopted by the AFCO committee in January 2012, but was withdrawn before being discussed in plenary in March 2012 for fear that it would likely be turned down.

On 13 March 2013 the European Parliament voted a new proposal updating seat assignments per country for 2014, taking into account demographic changes and bringing the total number of seats back to the nominal 751 enshrined in the Lisbon Treaty. The same document suggests the creation of a formal process "based on objective criteria to be applied in a pragmatic manner" for apportioning seats in future elections.

Apportionment in the European Parliament
Constituency	2007	2009	Dec. 2011	1 July 2013	A. Duff's 1st prop. for 2014	A. Duff's 2nd prop.			European Council Decision 2014	Population in 2013	Population per MEPs
Constituency	2007	2009	Dec. 2011	1 July 2013	A. Duff's 1st prop. for 2014	2014	2019	2024	European Council Decision 2014	Population in 2013	Population per MEPs
Pan-European	–	–	–	–	25	–	–	–	–	–	–
Germany	99	99	99	99	96	96	96	96	96	80,523,746	838,789
France	78	72	74	74	83	79	83	83	74	65,633,194	886,935
United Kingdom	78	72	73	73	80	76	79	80	73	63,896,071	875,289
Italy	78	72	73	73	78	75	78	78	73	59,685,227	817,606
Spain	54	50	54	54	61	58	61	61	54	46,704,308	864,895
Poland	54	50	51	51	51	51	51	51	51	38,533,299	755,555
Romania	35	33	33	33	31	31	31	31	32	20,020,074	625,627
Netherlands	27	25	26	26	25	25	25	25	26	16,779,575	645,368
Belgium	24	22	22	22	18	20	19	19	21	11,161,642	531,507
Greece	24	22	22	22	19	20	19	19	21	11,062,508	526,786
Czech Republic	24	22	22	22	18	20	18	18	21	10,516,125	500,768
Portugal	24	22	22	22	18	20	18	18	21	10,487,289	499,395
Hungary	24	22	22	22	17	20	18	17	21	9,908,798	471,848
Sweden	19	18	20	20	17	18	17	17	20	9,555,893	477,795
Austria	18	17	19	19	16	17	16	16	18	8,451,860	469,548
Bulgaria	18	17	18	18	15	16	14	14	17	7,284,552	428,503
Denmark	14	13	13	13	12	12	12	12	13	5,602,628	430,971
Finland	14	13	13	13	12	12	12	12	13	5,426,674	417,436
Slovakia	14	13	13	13	12	12	12	12	13	5,410,836	416,218
Ireland	13	12	12	12	11	11	11	11	11	4,591,087	417,372
Croatia	—	—	—	12	11	11	11	11	11	4,262,140	387,467
Lithuania	13	12	12	12	9	10	9	9	11	2,971,905	270,173
Slovenia	7	7	8	8	8	8	8	8	8	2,058,821	257,353
Latvia	9	8	9	9	8	8	8	8	8	2,023,825	252,978
Estonia	6	6	6	6	7	7	7	7	6	1,324,814	220,802
Cyprus	6	6	6	6	6	6	6	6	6	865,878	144,313
Luxembourg	6	6	6	6	6	6	6	6	6	537,039	89,507
Malta	5	5	6	6	6	6	6	6	6	421,364	70,227
total	785	736	754	766	776	751	751	751	751	505,701,172	673,370

=== 2019 election ===
The EU needed to revise the apportionment of seats in time for the next European Parliament election, expected to be held in May 2019, when the United Kingdom's 73 MEPs may have vacated their seats following Brexit. In April 2017, a group of European lawmakers discussed what should be done about the vacated seats. One plan, supported by Enrico Letta, Gianni Pittella and Emmanuel Macron, was to replace the 73 seats with a pan-European constituency list. Other options which were considered include dropping the British seats without replacement and reassigning some or all of the existing seats from other countries to reduce inequality of representation. A plan to reduce the number of seats to 705 was approved by the Parliament in February 2018. It involves redistributing 27 seats to under-represented members and reserving the remaining 46 for future EU expansions. A proposal by the Constitutional Affairs Committee to create a pan-member constituency was rejected by the Parliament at the same time. The proposed redistribution did not occur due to the Brexit extension until 31 October, and the allocation used was the same as in 2014. After Brexit took legal effect, the seat distribution was decided by the European Council. Those countries which were allocated additional seats elected MEPs who only took office after Brexit had taken effect.

Apportionment in the European Parliament
Country	2007	2009	Dec. 2011	July 2013	2014	Proposals for 2019 after the removal of UK seats				Population	
Country	2007	2009	Dec. 2011	July 2013	2014	Cambridge Compromise		Decision (Feb 2018)	Change from 2014	2017	Thousands per MEP
Country	2007	2009	Dec. 2011	July 2013	2014	Minimizing Gini (Note: The Gini coefficient defines how equal (or unequal) is the distribution of seats among member states represented in the parliament. According to ref., the Gini coefficient of the European Parliament, before changes coming from brexit, is 17.5%, making it very unequal; as a point of comparison, the US House of representative scores a 2.2%, the German Bundestag 3.4%.)	Minimizing malapportionment	Decision (Feb 2018)	Change from 2014	2017	Thousands per MEP
Germany	99	99	99	99	96	96	96	96	Steady	82,521,653	860
France	78	72	74	74	74	79	96	79	▲ +5	66,989,083	848
United Kingdom	78	72	73	73	73	–	–	–	▼ -73	–	–
Italy	78	72	73	73	73	73	89	76	▲ +3	60,589,445	797
Spain	54	50	54	54	54	57	70	59	▲ +5	46,528,024	789
Poland	54	50	51	51	51	47	58	52	▲ +1	37,972,964	730
Romania	35	33	33	33	32	27	33	33	▲ +1	19,644,350	595
Netherlands	27	25	26	26	26	24	29	29	▲ +3	17,081,507	589
Belgium	24	22	22	22	21	18	21	21	Steady	11,351,727	541
Greece	24	22	22	22	21	17	20	21	Steady	10,768,193	513
Czech Republic	24	22	22	22	21	17	20	21	Steady	10,578,820	504
Hungary	24	22	22	22	21	16	19	21	Steady	9,797,561	467
Portugal	24	22	22	22	21	17	20	21	Steady	10,309,573	491
Sweden	19	18	20	20	20	16	19	21	▲ +1	9,995,153	476
Austria	18	17	19	19	18	15	18	19	▲ +1	8,772,865	462
Bulgaria	18	17	18	18	17	13	15	17	Steady	7,101,859	418
Denmark	14	13	13	13	13	12	13	14	▲ +1	5,748,769	411
Finland	14	13	13	13	13	12	13	14	▲ +1	5,503,297	393
Slovakia	14	13	13	13	13	12	13	14	▲ +1	5,435,343	388
Ireland	13	12	12	12	11	11	12	13	▲ +2	4,784,383	368
Croatia	–	–	–	12	11	10	11	12	▲ +1	4,154,213	346
Lithuania	13	12	12	12	11	9	9	11	Steady	2,847,904	259
Latvia	9	8	9	9	8	8	8	8	Steady	1,950,116	244
Slovenia	7	7	8	8	8	8	8	8	Steady	2,065,895	258
Estonia	6	6	6	6	6	7	7	7	▲ +1	1,315,635	188
Cyprus	6	6	6	6	6	6	7	6	Steady	854,802	142
Luxembourg	6	6	6	6	6	6	6	6	Steady	590,667	98
Malta	6	6	6	6	6	6	6	6	Steady	460,297	77
Total	785	736	754	766	751	639	736	705	▼ –46	445,714,098 (Note: Population of the EU without the United Kingdom)	632

=== 2024 election ===
In February 2023, the AFCO committee of the European Parliament released a draft report (whose rapporteurs are Lóránt Vincze and Sandro Gozi) on the necessary changes to the composition of the European Parliament in order to respect the principle of degressive proportionality (enshrined in the TEU). The draft report suggested a new apportionment which aimed at respecting the degressive proportionality while also resulting in no loss of seats for any Member State, therefore leading to an expansion in the number of MEPs, from 705 to 716. On 12 June 2023, the report was approved by the AFCO committee, with the apportionment being unchanged compared to the draft report. On 15 June 2023 the report was approved by the EP plenary.

In July 2023, the European Council put forward its own proposed apportionment for the tenth European Parliament, which would add 15 new MEPs and thus take the number of seats from 705 to 720. In this proposal, no Member State would lose any spots in the hemicycle and the countries gaining new seats would be as indicated in the table below under New allocation of seats (final decision for 2024).

On 15 September 2023, the European Parliament approved the apportionment proposed by the Council, with 515 votes in favor, 74 against and 44 abstentions.

Furthermore, this decision envisages the future (before the 2029–2034 parliamentary term) definition of "an objective, fair, durable and transparent seat distribution method implementing the principle of degressive proportionality, without prejudice to the institutions’ prerogatives under the Treaties".

Member state	Population (2023)	MEPs	Ratio population/seats	New allocation of seats (AFCO draft)	Change from 2022 (AFCO draft)	New ratio population/seats (AFCO draft)	New allocation of seats (final decision for 2024)	Change from 2022 (final decision for 2024)	New ratio population/seats (final decision for 2024)
Germany	84,358,845	96	878,738	96	Steady	878,738	96	Steady	878,738
France	68,070,697	79	858,767	79	Steady	861,654	81	▲ +2	840,379
Italy	58,850,717	76	774,352	76	Steady	774,352	76	Steady	774,352
Spain	48,059,777	59	814,572	61	▲ +2	787,865	61	▲ +2	787,865
Poland	36,753,736	52	706,803	52	Steady	706,803	53	▲ +1	693,467
Romania	19,051,562	33	577,320	33	Steady	577,320	33	Steady	577,320
Netherlands	17,811,291	29	614,182	31	▲ +2	574,558	31	▲ +2	574,558
Belgium	11,754,004	21	559,714	21	Steady	559,714	22	▲ +1	534,273
Czech Republic	10,827,529	21	515,597	21	Steady	515,597	21	Steady	515,597
Sweden	10,521,556	21	501,026	21	Steady	501,026	21	Steady	501,026
Portugal	10,467,366	21	498,446	21	Steady	498,446	21	Steady	498,446
Greece	10,394,055	21	494,955	21	Steady	494,955	21	Steady	494,955
Hungary	9,597,085	21	457,004	21	Steady	457,004	21	Steady	457,004
Austria	9,104,772	19	479,199	20	▲ +1	455,239	20	▲ +1	455,239
Bulgaria	6,447,710	17	379,277	17	Steady	379,277	17	Steady	379,277
Denmark	5,932,654	14	423,761	15	▲ +1	395,510	15	▲ +1	395,510
Finland	5,563,970	14	397,426	15	▲ +1	370,931	15	▲ +1	370,931
Slovakia	5,428,792	14	387,771	15	▲ +1	361,919	15	▲ +1	361,919
Ireland	5,194,336	13	399,564	14	▲ +1	371,024	14	▲ +1	371,024
Croatia	3,850,894	12	320,908	12	Steady	320,908	12	Steady	320,908
Lithuania	2,857,279	11	259,753	11	Steady	259,753	11	Steady	259,753
Slovenia	2,116,792	8	264,599	9	▲ +1	235,199	9	▲ +1	235,199
Latvia	1,883,008	8	235,376	9	▲ +1	209,223	9	▲ +1	209,223
Estonia	1,365,884	7	195,126	7	Steady	195,126	7	Steady	195,126
Cyprus	920,701	6	153,450	6	Steady	153,450	6	Steady	153,450
Luxembourg	660,809	6	110,135	6	Steady	110,135	6	Steady	110,135
Malta	542,051	6	90,342	6	Steady	90,342	6	Steady	90,342
European Union	448,387,872	705	636,011	716	▲ +11	626,240	720	▲ +15	622,761

Degressive proportionality breached.

== Changes in membership ==
State	Joined	Sep 1952	Mar 1957	Jan 1973	Jun 1979	Jan 1981	Jan 1986	Jun 1994	Jan 1995	May 2004	Jun 2004	Jan 2007	Jun 2009	Dec 2011	Jul 2013	Jun 2014	Feb 2020	June 2024
Germany	1951	18	36	36	81	81	81	99	99	99	99	99	99	99	99	96	96	96
France	1951	18	36	36	81	81	81	87	87	87	78	78	72	74	74	74	79	81
United Kingdom	1973			36	81	81	81	87	87	87	78	78	72	73	73	73		
Italy	1951	18	36	36	81	81	81	87	87	87	78	78	72	73	73	73	76	76
Spain	1986						60	64	64	64	54	54	50	54	54	54	59	61
Poland	2004									54	54	54	50	51	51	51	52	53
Romania	2007											35	33	33	33	32	33	33
Netherlands	1951	10	14	14	25	25	25	31	31	31	27	27	25	26	26	26	29	31
Belgium	1951	10	14	14	24	24	24	25	25	25	24	24	22	22	22	21	21	22
Greece	1981					24	24	25	25	25	24	24	22	22	22	21	21	21
Czech Republic	2004									24	24	24	22	22	22	21	21	21
Portugal	1986						24	25	25	25	24	24	22	22	22	21	21	21
Sweden	1995								22	22	19	19	18	20	20	20	21	21
Hungary	2004									24	24	24	22	22	22	21	21	21
Austria	1995								21	21	18	18	17	19	19	18	19	20
Bulgaria	2007											18	17	18	18	17	17	17
Denmark	1973			10	16	16	16	16	16	16	14	14	13	13	13	13	14	15
Finland	1995								16	16	14	14	13	13	13	13	14	15
Slovakia	2004									14	14	14	13	13	13	13	14	15
Ireland	1973			10	15	15	15	15	15	15	13	13	12	12	12	11	13	14
Croatia	2013														12	11	12	12
Lithuania	2004									13	13	13	12	12	12	11	11	11
Slovenia	2004									7	7	7	7	8	8	8	8	9
Latvia	2004									9	9	9	8	9	9	8	8	9
Estonia	2004									6	6	6	6	6	6	6	7	7
Cyprus	2004									6	6	6	6	6	6	6	6	6
Luxembourg	1951	4	6	6	6	6	6	6	6	6	6	6	6	6	6	6	6	6
Malta	2004									5	5	5	5	6	6	6	6	6
Total		78	142	198	410	434	518	567	626	788	732	785	736	754	766	751	705	720

Source for MEP figures 1952–2004: European Navigator. Source for population figures and MEP figures for 2007 and 2009: European Parliament, full population figures . December 2011 figures reflect the members added to the European Parliament by the Protocol Amending the Protocol on Transitional Provisions (OJ 29.9.2010, C 263, p. 1) which came into force on 1 December 2011. Figures for 2019 follow parliamentary decision of February 2018.

== See also ==
- United States congressional apportionment
- Weighted voting
