= Jagiellonian compromise =

Electoral system for two-tier voting bodies

The Jagiellonian compromise is an electoral system for two-tier voting bodies originally proposed in 2004 for the Council of the European Union as a way of achieving "one person, one vote" within the union. The compromise, proposed by two authors from the Jagiellonian University, was analysed by various authors and received attention in the popular press. The system is based on the square root law of Penrose, which implies that a priori voting power defined by the Penrose–Banzhaf index of a member of a voting body is inversely proportional to the square root of its size. Hence the number of votes obtained by a representative of a state $j$ with population $N_j$ is proportional to $\sqrt{N_j}$. Jagiellonian Compromise is based on a single criterion only. Decision of the Council of the union of $M$ member states is taken if the sum of the weights of states voting in favour of a given proposal exceeds the qualified majority quota $q$ equal to

$$q = \frac12 \cdot\left(1 + \frac{\sqrt{\sum_{i=1}^M N_i}}{\sum_{i=1}^M \sqrt{N_i}}\right)$$

For a generic distribution of population among $M$ states of the union, the optimal threshold $q_*$ decreases with $M$ as $q_* \approx 1/2 +1/\sqrt{\pi M}$. The number $\pi$ appears in an expression related to voting theory as a consequence of an averaging over the Dirichlet distribution.

== See also ==
- List of countries and dependencies by population
- Penrose method
- Jagiellonian University
