= Lionel Penrose =

British medical geneticist

- Penrose, c. 1971
- Born: Lionel Sharples Penrose; 11 June 1898; London, UK
- Died: 12 May 1972 (aged 73); London, UK
- Spouse: Margaret Leathes (m. 1928)
- Children: Oliver Penrose; Roger Penrose; Jonathan Penrose; Shirley Hodgson
- Father: James Penrose
- Scientific career
- Education: St John's College, Cambridge; University of Vienna; King's College London
- Known for: Penrose triangle Penrose method Penrose stairs Penrose's Law; Penrose square root law Penrose–Banzhaf index
- Awards: Lasker Award; James Spence Medal 1964.
- Fields: Paediatrics, Psychiatry, Genetics
- Workplaces: University of Cambridge; University College London; Western University

Lionel Sharples Penrose FRS (11 June 1898 – 12 May 1972) was an English psychiatrist, medical geneticist, paediatrician, mathematician and chess theorist, who carried out pioneering work on the genetics of intellectual disability. Penrose was initially the Galton professor of eugenics (1945–1963) at University College London, before having his title changed to professor of human genetics (1963–1965) at his request. He was later emeritus professor.

== Education ==
Penrose was educated at the Downs School, Colwall and the Quaker Leighton Park School, Reading. On leaving school in 1916, he served, as a conscientious objector, with the Friends' Ambulance Unit/British Red Cross in France until the end of the First World War. He went on to study at St John's College, Cambridge, where he was a Cambridge Apostle. At Cambridge, he gained a first class degree in moral sciences before leaving for Vienna for a year, to study at the psychological department at the University of Vienna. In 1928, he qualified with the conjoint in 1928 at St Thomas' Hospital before qualifying for a Doctor of Medicine in 1930.

== Career ==
Penrose undertook research into schizophrenia, designing tests of intelligence that were non-verbal in nature that are still in use. He was one of the earliest investigators of phenylketonuria in the 1930s.

Penrose's "Colchester Survey", produced as a report in 1938, in collaboration with the MRC called the MRC special report: No.229, Clinical and genetic study of 1,280 cases of mental defect, was the earliest serious attempt to study the genetics of intellectual disability. He found that the relatives of patients with severe intellectual disability were usually unaffected but some of them were affected with similar severity to the original patient, whereas the relatives of patients with mild intellectual disability tended mostly to have mild or borderline disability. Penrose went on to identify and study many of the genetic and chromosomal causes of intellectual disability (then called mental deficiency). This body of work culminated in the book The Biology of Mental Defect.

From 1939 to 1945, he was director of psychiatric research at the Ontario Hospital, lecturer in psychiatry at Western University, and medical statistician to the province. Penrose was a central figure in British medical genetics following World War II. From 1945 to 1965, he worked as Galton Professor at the Galton Laboratory at University College London. The first title of his chair was "Professor of Eugenics" (1945–1963), then he had it changed to "Professor of Human Genetics" (1963–1965). According to his successor, Professor Harry Harris, Penrose "never liked the name 'eugenics', because it seemed to him to be too much associated with uninformed and dangerous policies of racial purification." Harris also reported the "long delay" in changing this name was due to "legal problems" associated with the original donation from Francis Galton and described how Penrose simply ignored the "eugenics" element of his job title.

Penrose's Law states that the population size of prisons and psychiatric hospitals are inversely related, although this is generally viewed as something of an oversimplification.

Penrose, a member of the Society of Friends (Quakers), was a lead figure in the Medical Association for the Prevention of War in the 1950s.

Penrose developed the Penrose method, a method for apportioning seats in a global assembly based on the square root of each nation's population. Such a voting system is based on the idea that the voting power of any voter (measured by the Penrose–Banzhaf index) decreases with the size of the voting body as one over its square root. See also Penrose square root law.

Penrose was particularly interested in different facets of biology, for example fingerprints, demography, and cytogenetics, which were a result of his research into the etiology of intellectual disability, especially Down syndrome. He did intensive research on the latter, communicating the results of his investigations in 1963 and winning the Joseph P. Kennedy Jr. Foundation Award for his contributions to the understanding of the causes of intellectual disability.

== Awards and honours ==
Penrose received a number of awards and honours including the 1960 Albert Lasker Award for Basic Medical Research. The Lasker citation read:

"Professor Penrose and his associates have been responsible over the years for studies which touch all aspects of human genetics, include genetic analyses of most of the known hereditary diseases, contributions to mathematical genetics, biochemical genetics, the study of gene linkage in man, and theoretical work on the mutagenic effect of ionizing radiations. Most recently their attention has been turned to abnormalities of human chromosomes associated with congenital defects, particularly mongolism [Down syndrome]."

Penrose was awarded the James Spence Gold Medal of the Royal College of Paediatrics and Child Health in 1964 for major contributions in human genetics and extensive research into Down syndrome and Intellectual disability."

== Family ==
Lionel Penrose's father was James Doyle Penrose. His mother, Elisabeth Josephine, was daughter of Alexander Peckover, 1st Baron Peckover; his brother was Sir Roland Penrose, both British artists. He married Margaret Leathes in 1928 and they had four children:

- Oliver Penrose, born 1929, physicist;
- Sir Roger Penrose, born 1931, mathematical physicist and mathematician (with whom Lionel co-authored papers on the Penrose triangle); and who shared the 2020 Nobel Prize in Physics;
- Jonathan Penrose, (1933–2021), chess grandmaster and psychologist;
- Shirley Hodgson, born 1945, geneticist.

After Penrose's death, Margaret married the mathematician Max Newman (1897–1984). She died in 1989.
