= Oliver Penrose =

British theoretical physicist (born 1929)

- Born: 6 June 1929 (age 97); Marylebone, London, England
- Education: University College, London; King's College, Cambridge
- Known for: Penrose criterion Off-diagonal long-range order
- Father: Lionel Penrose
- Relatives: Roger Penrose (brother); Jonathan Penrose (brother); Shirley Hodgson (sister); J. Doyle Penrose (grandfather); John Beresford Leathes (grandfather); Antony Penrose (cousin)
- Awards: FRS (1987)
- Scientific career
- Fields: Physics
- Workplaces: Imperial College, London; Open University; Heriot-Watt University
- Doctoral advisor: Neville Temperley
- Website: www.macs.hw.ac.uk/~oliver/

Oliver Penrose FRS FRSE (born 6 June 1929) is a British theoretical physicist and emeritus professor at Heriot-Watt University. His topics of interest include statistical mechanics, phase transitions in metals and the physical chemistry of surfactants. He is known for introducing the concept of off-diagonal long-range order, important to the present understanding of superfluids and superconductors. He is also known for the Penrose criterion in plasma physics.

Penrose was associated with the Open University for seventeen years and was a Professor of Mathematics at Heriot-Watt University in Edinburgh from 1986 until his retirement in 1994.

Penrose has worked in fundamental topics, which include understanding the physical basis for the direction of time and interpretations of quantum mechanics.

== Family ==
He is the son of the scientist Lionel Penrose and brother of the mathematical physicist and Nobel laureate in Physics Roger Penrose, chess Grandmaster Jonathan Penrose, and geneticist Shirley Hodgson.
