= Humphrey Hodgson =

Humphrey Julian Francis Hodgson FRCP FMedSci (born 5 April (according to Who's Who) or 5 May 1945 (according to Debrett's)) is a British professor of medicine. He is Dame Sheila Sherlock Professor of Medicine, at UCL Medical School in London.

He married Shirley Penrose in 1971, they have a son and a daughter.
