= Shirley Hodgson =

British geneticist

Shirley Hodgson FRCP FRSB
- Born: 22 February 1945 (age 81)
- Education: Somerville College, Oxford
- Occupation: Geneticist
- Employer: St George's, University of London
- Spouse: Humphrey Hodgson (m. 1971)
- Children: 2
- Parents: Lionel Penrose; Margaret Leathes
- Relatives: Oliver Penrose (brother); Roger Penrose (brother); Jonathan Penrose (brother)

Shirley Victoria Penrose Hodgson (born 22 February 1945) is a British geneticist.

== Biography ==
Hodgson studied at Somerville College, Oxford. She worked as a GP, then performed as a locum in clinical genetics at Guy's Hospital, saying she found the subject "irresistible". She became Senior Registrar in Clinical Genetics for the South Thames (East) Regional Genetics Centre and Honorary Senior Registrar at Hammersmith Hospital, London, from 1983 to 1988; then Consultant Geneticist at Addenbrooke's Hospital from 1988 to 1990. In the 1990s, she led the regional cancer genetics service at Guy's and St Thomas' Hospital.

She has been a Professor of Cancer Genetics at St George's, University of London since 2003.

Hodgson is the daughter of Lionel Penrose and his wife Margaret Leathes and the granddaughter of the physiologist John Beresford Leathes. She has three older brothers, Oliver, Sir Roger, and Jonathan Penrose. She married Humphrey Hodgson in 1971.

She is a Fellow of the Royal College of Physicians, and a Fellow of the Royal Society of Biology.

== Works ==
Hodgson is the author of many academic papers and several books, including:

- Hodgson, Shirley V.; Foulkes, William D.; Eng, Charis; Maher, Eamonn (2013). A Practical Guide to Human Cancer Genetics. Springer Science & Business Media. ISBN 978-1-4471-2375-0.
- Foulkes, William D.; Hodgson, Shirley V. (1998). Inherited Susceptibility to Cancer: Clinical, Predictive and Ethical Perspectives. Cambridge University Press. ISBN 978-0-521-56340-6.
- Haites (2002). Patrick J. Morrison; Shirley V. Hodgson; Neva E. (eds.). Familial breast and ovarian cancer : genetics, screening and management. Cambridge Univ. Press. ISBN 9780521803731.
