= Degressive proportionality =

Apportionment approach

Degressive or progressive proportionality is an approach to the allocation of seats in a legislative body among administrative divisions of varying population sizes. It aims for fair representation of each division while also taking into account the number of voters in each one. Under systems using degressive proportionality, smaller divisions therefore have a higher seats-to-votes ratio. It is used in the European Parliament and the Bundesrat of Germany, among others.

Degressive proportionality is an alternative to, for instance, each subdivision electing the same number of members, or electing a number of members strictly proportional to its population. Degressive proportionality is intermediate between those two approaches. Political and philosophical justifications of degressive proportionality have been proposed.. Degressive proportionality can be achieved through various methods, and the term does not describe any one particular formula. Any system that reserves a minimum number of seats for a sub-body is to some extent degressively proportional.

== By region ==
=== European Parliament ===
Under the Treaty of Lisbon, the European Parliament uses a system of degressive proportionality to allocate its 720 seats among the member states of the European Union. Treaty negotiations, rather than a specific formula, determine the apportionment between member states.

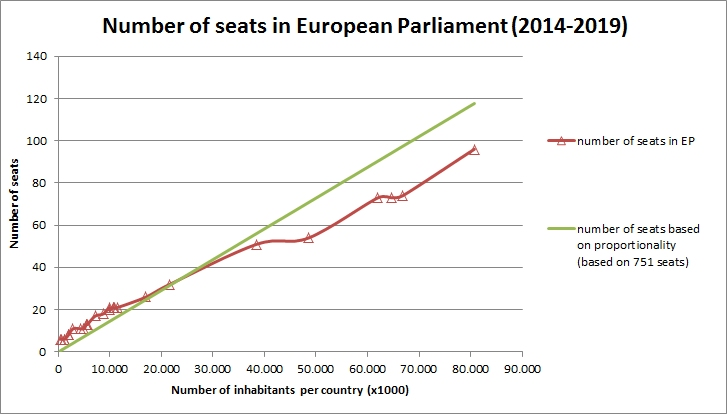
Number of seats in EP 2014–2019 versus number of inhabitants, showing difference with proportionality.

=== Germany ===
Each German state has three to six seats in the Bundesrat of Germany depending on its population. This means the least populous state, Bremen (with 663,000 inhabitants), has three seats while the most populous one, North Rhine-Westphalia (with 18,058,000 inhabitants), has only six seats.

=== Spain ===
Spain's Congress of Deputies adds two extra seats to the otherwise proportional number allocated to each province.

=== United States ===
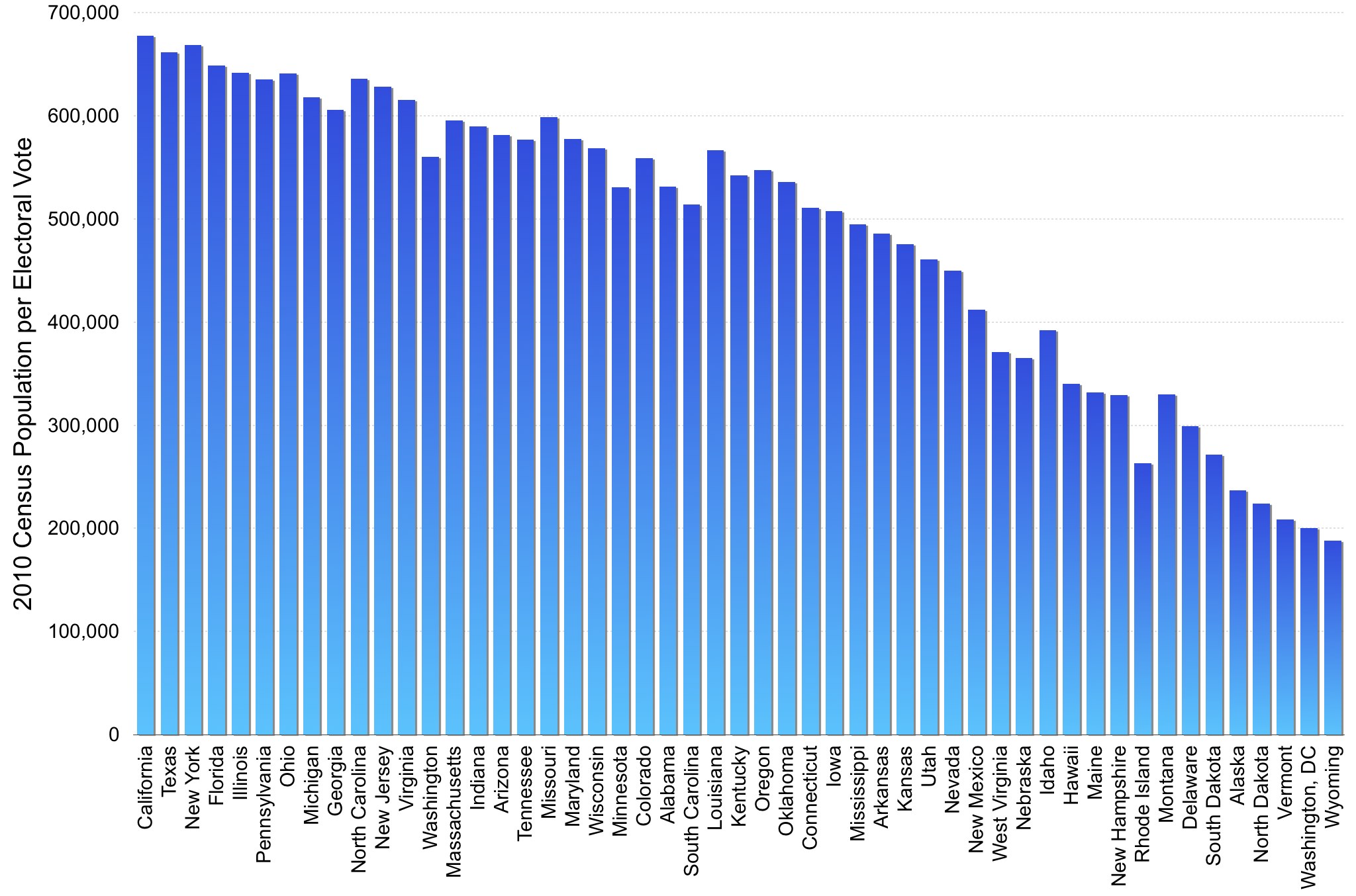
State population per U.S. electoral college vote for the 50 states and Washington D.C., based on 2010 census. States are ordered from left to right according to total state population.

In the US Electoral College, where each state has as many electors as senators and representatives added, the combination of systems often yields a degressive proportional distribution, although this may not happen depending on the second method's rounding method. As each state has a minimum of three members of the college, voters in smaller states have disproportionally more say in the election than the national average.

== Advantages ==
Degressive proportionality can reduce concerns that the largest electoral divisions will dominate the legislature. It also increases representation for the smallest divisions, which may have significantly different interests from the majority, especially those on the periphery of the territory. It may also thereby decrease the potential for unrest in those divisions due to perceived lack of representation.

== Disadvantages ==
Certain smaller areas are not recognised as separate subdivisions for electoral purposes, and are thereby not accorded the same treatment as areas that are recognised. Sometimes this can be done intentionally in the form of gerrymandering.

== See also ==
- Penrose method (square root of the population)
- Weighted voting

== Sources ==
- Koriyama, Yukio; Laslier, Jean-François; Macé, Antonin; Treibich, Rafael (2013). "Optimal apportionnment". Journal of Political Economy. pp. 584–608.
