= Penrose square root law =

Law of voting power distribution

In the mathematical theory of games, the Penrose square root law, originally formulated by Lionel Penrose, concerns the distribution of the voting power in a voting body consisting of N members. It states that the a priori voting power of any voter, measured by the Penrose–Banzhaf index $\psi$ scales like $1/\sqrt{N}$.

This result was used to design the Penrose method for allocating the voting weights of representatives in a decision-making body proportional to the square root of the population represented.

== Short derivation ==
To estimate the voting index of any player one needs to estimate the number of the possible winning coalitions in which his vote is decisive. Assume for simplicity that the number of voters is odd, N = 2j + 1, and the body votes according to the standard majority rule. Following Penrose one concludes that a given voter will be able to effectively influence the outcome of the voting only if the votes split half and half: if j players say 'Yes' and the remaining j players vote 'No', the last vote is decisive.

Assuming that all members of the body vote independently (the votes are uncorrelated) and that the probability of each vote 'Yes' is equal to p = 1/2 one can estimate likelihood of such an event using the Bernoulli trial. The probability to obtain j votes 'Yes' out of 2j votes reads

$$P_j = \left(  \frac{1}{2}\right)  ^{2j}\frac{\left( 2j\right)!}{\left( j! \right)^2}.$$

For large N we may use the Stirling's approximation for the factorial j ! and obtain the probability $\psi$ that the vote of a given voter is decisive

$$\psi=P_j \sim 2^{-2j}\frac{(2j/e)^{2j}\sqrt{4\pi j}}{[(j/e)^j \sqrt{2\pi
j}]^{2}}\ =\ \frac{1}{\sqrt{\pi j}} \sim \sqrt{\frac{2}{\pi}} \frac{1}{\sqrt{N}}.$$

The same approximation is obtained for an even number N.

A mathematical investigation of the influence of possible correlations between the voters for the Penrose square root law was presented by Kirsch.

Penrose law is applied to construct Penrose-like systems of two-tier voting, including the Jagiellonian Compromise designed for the Council of the European Union.

== See also ==
- Jagiellonian Compromise
