= Penrose criterion =

In plasma physics, the Penrose criterion is a rule for the kinetic stability of a plasma with a given velocity-space distribution function. This criterion can be used to determine that all so-called "single-humped" distributions (those with a single maximum), are kinetically stable. It is not employed in accounting for the electric field. The criterion is named after Oliver Penrose who proposed it in 1960.
