= Parties in the European Council between January and April 2004 =

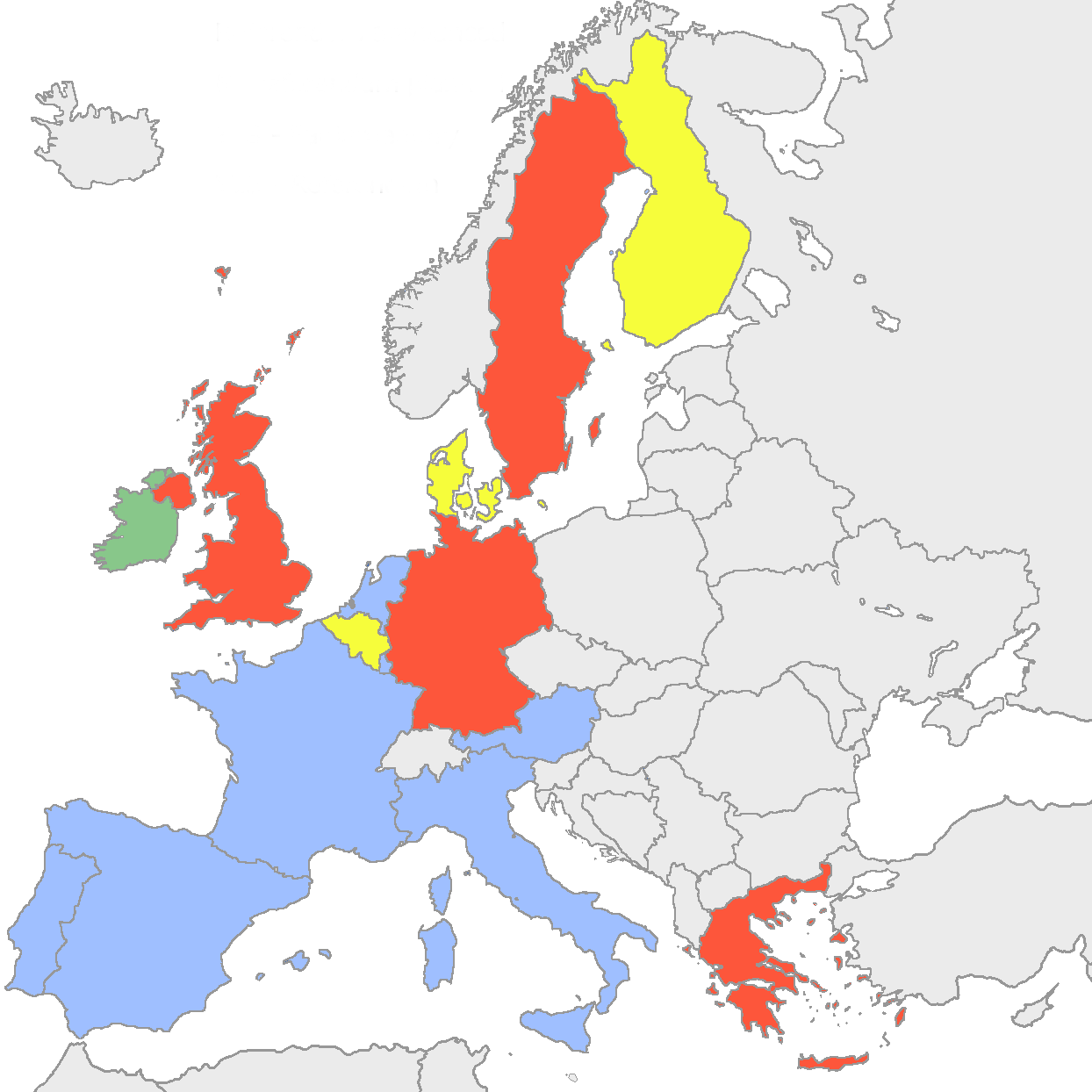
The member-states of the European Union by the European party affiliations of their leaders, as of 1 January 2004.

Prior to 1 May 2004 the European Union had fifteen members. On that date ten new member states were admitted. This article describes the party affiliations of the leaders of each member-state represented in the European Council from the beginning of 2004 until 1 May. The list below gives the political party that each head of government, or head of state, belonged to at the national level, as well as the European political alliance to which that national party belonged. The states are listed from most to least populous. More populous states have greater influence in the council, in accordance with the system of Qualified Majority Voting.

During the period in question only two changes of government occurred: in Greece and Spain, and taken together these left the overall balance of party affiliations in the Council unchanged.

== Summary ==
Party	1 January 2004		10 March 2004		27 April 2004
Party	#	QMV	#	QMV	#	QMV
European People's Party	7	44	8	49	7	41
Party of European Socialists	4	29	3	24	4	32
European Liberal Democrat and Reform Party	3	11	3	11	3	11
Alliance for Europe of the Nations	1	3	1	3	1	3

== List of leaders (1 January 2004) ==
Member-state	Votes	Leader	National party	European party
Germany	10	Gerhard Schröder	SPD	PES
France	10	Jacques Chirac	UMP	EPP
United Kingdom	10	Tony Blair	Lab	PES
Italy	10	Silvio Berlusconi	FI	EPP
Spain	8	José María Aznar	PP	EPP
Netherlands	5	Jan Peter Balkenende	CDA	EPP
Greece	5	Costas Simitis	PA.SO.K.	PES
Belgium	5	Guy Verhofstadt	VLD	ELDR
Portugal	5	José Manuel Barroso	PPD/PSD	EPP
Sweden	4	Göran Persson	SAP	PES
Austria	4	Wolfgang Schüssel	ÖVP	EPP
Denmark	3	Anders Fogh Rasmussen	V	ELDR
Finland	3	Matti Vanhanen	Kesk.	ELDR
Ireland	3	Bertie Ahern	FF	AEN
Luxembourg	2	Jean-Claude Juncker	CSV	EPP

== Changes ==
=== Affiliation ===
Date	Member-state	Leader	National party	European group
10 March	Greece	Kostas Karamanlis	ND	EPP
27 April	Spain	José Luis Rodríguez Zapatero	PSOE	PES

== See also ==
- Presidency of the Council of the European Union
