= Outcome (game theory) =

In game theory, the outcome of a game is the ultimate result of a strategic interaction with one or more people, dependant on the choices made by all participants in a certain exchange. It represents the final payoff resulting from a set of actions that individuals can take within the context of the game. Outcomes are pivotal in determining the payoffs and expected utility for parties involved. Game theorists commonly study how the outcome of a game is determined and what factors affect it.

A strategy is a set of actions that a player can take in response to the actions of others. Each player’s strategy is based on their expectation of what the other players are likely to do, often explained in terms of probability. Outcomes are dependent on the combination of strategies chosen by involved players and can be represented in a number of ways; one common way is a payoff matrix showing the individual payoffs for each players with a combination of strategies, as seen in the payoff matrix example below. Outcomes can be expressed in terms of monetary value or utility to a specific person. Additionally, a game tree can be used to deduce the actions leading to an outcome by displaying possible sequences of actions and the outcomes associated.

Payoff Matrix Example
Strategies of Player A	Strategies of Player B	
Strategies of Player A	1	2
1	A_{1,} B_{1}	A_{1,} B_{2}
2	A_{2,} B_{1}	A_{2,} B_{2}

A commonly used theorem in relation to outcomes is the Nash equilibrium. This theorem is a combination of strategies in which no player can improve their payoff or outcome by changing their strategy, given the strategies of the other players. In other words, a Nash equilibrium is a set of strategies in which each player is doing the best possible, assuming what the others are doing to receive the most optimal outcome for themselves. Not all games have a unique nash equilibrium and if they do, it may not be the most desirable outcome. Additionally, the desired outcomes is greatly affected by individuals chosen strategies, and their beliefs on what they believe other players will do under the assumption that players will make the most rational decision for themselves. A common example of the nash equilibrium and undesirable outcomes is the Prisoner’s Dilemma game.

== Choosing among outcomes ==
Many different concepts exist to express how players might interact. An optimal interaction may be one in which no player's payoff can be made greater, without making any other player's payoff lesser. Such a payoff is described as Pareto efficient, and the set of such payoffs is called the Pareto frontier.

Many economists study the ways in which payoffs are in some sort of economic equilibrium. One example of such an equilibrium is the Nash equilibrium, where each player plays a strategy such that their payoff is maximized given the strategy of the other players.

Players are persons who make logical economic decisions. It is assumed that human people make all of their economic decisions based only on the idea that they are rational. A player's rewards (utilities, profits, income, or subjective advantages) are assumed to be maximised. The purpose of game-theoretic analysis, when applied to a rational approach, is to provide recommendations on how to make choices against other rational players. First, it reduces the possible outcomes; logical action is more predictable than irrational. Second, it provides a criterion for assessing an economic system's efficiency.

In a Prisoner's Dilemma game between two players, player one and player two can choose the utilities that are the best response to maximise their outcomes. "A best response to a coplayer’s strategy is a strategy that yields the highest payoff against that particular strategy". A matrix is used to present the payoff of both players in the game. For example, the best response of player one is the highest payoff for player one’s move, and vice versa. For player one, they will pick the payoffs from the column strategies. For player two, they will choose their moves based on the two row strategies. Assuming both players do not know the opponents strategies. It is a dominant strategy for the first player to choose a payoff of 5 rather than a payoff of 3 because strategy D is a better response than strategy C.

== Applications ==
Outcome optimisation in game theory has many real world applications that can help predict actions and economic behaviours by other players. Examples of this include stock trades and investments, cost of goods in business, corporate behaviour and even social sciences.

Equilibria are not always Pareto efficient, and a number of game theorists design ways to enforce Pareto efficient play, or play that satisfies some other sort of social optimality. The theory of this is called implementation theory.
