= Parties in the European Council between May and December 2004 =

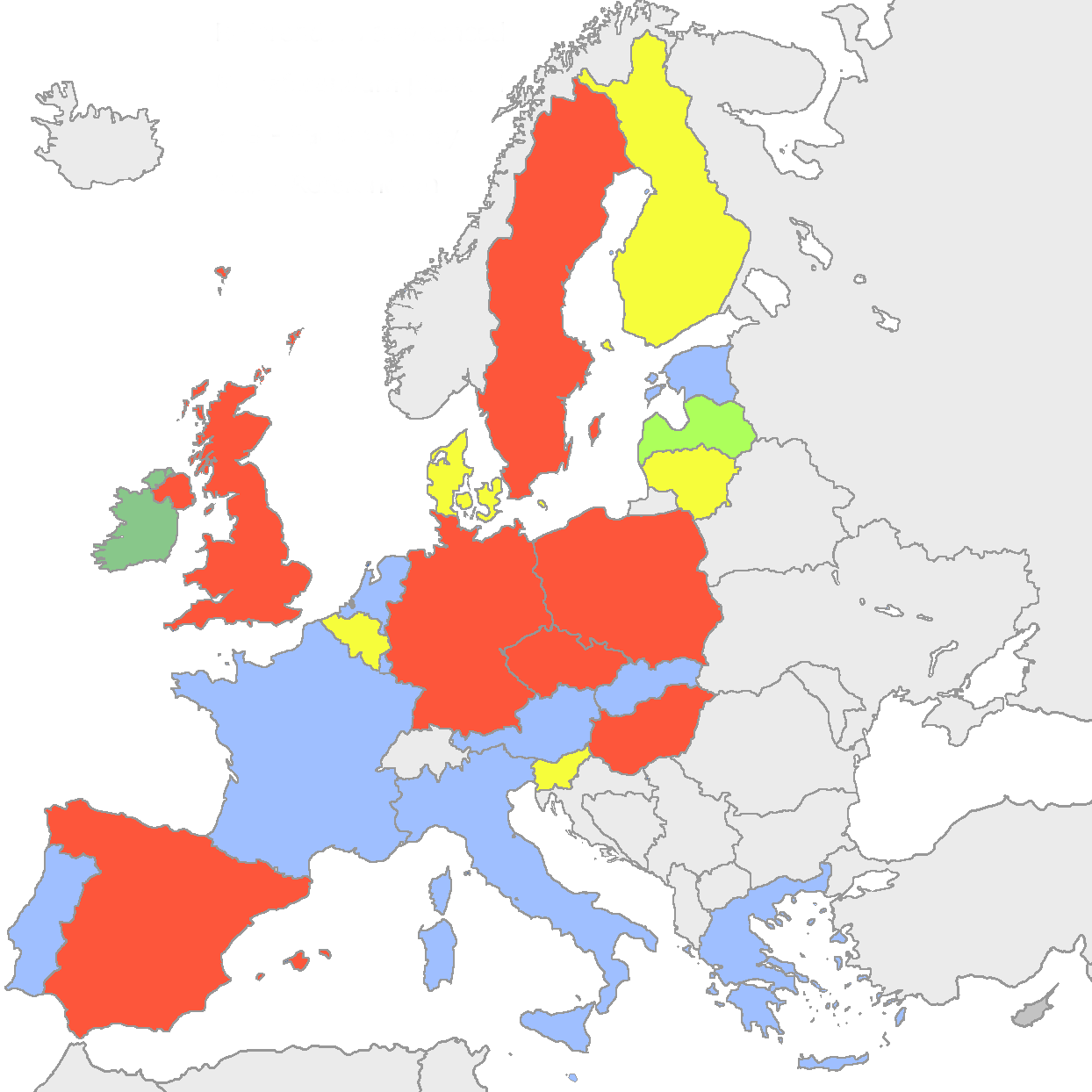
The member-states of the European Union by the European party affiliations of their leaders, as of 1 May 2004.

On 1 May 2004 ten new member states joined the European Union. This article describes the party affiliations of the leaders of each member-state represented in the European Council from 1 May until the end of 2004. The list below gives the political party that each head of government, or head of state, belonged to at the national level, as well as the European political alliance to which that national party belonged. The states are listed from most to least populous. More populous states have greater influence in the council, in accordance with the system of Qualified Majority Voting.

== Summary ==
Party	1 May 2004		12 July 2004		1 November 2004		2 December 2004		3 December 2004
Party	#	QMV^{a}	#	QMV^{a}	#	QMV^{b}	#	QMV^{b}	#	QMV^{b}
Party of European Socialists	7	50	7	50	7	146	7	146	7	146
European People's Party	10	49	10	49	10	123	11	127	12	131
European Liberal Democrat and Reform Party	5	17	4	14	4	30	4	30	3	26
Alliance for Europe of the Nations	1	3	1	3	1	7	1	7	1	7
European Green Party	1	3	1	3	1	4	0	0	0	0
Independent	1	2	2	5	2	11	2	11	2	11

^{a} – Transitional QMV system with 124 total votes and a qualified majority of 88 (70.97%), in use until 1 November 2004.
^{b} – Final EU-25 QMV system with 321 total votes and a qualified majority of 232 (72.27%).

== List of leaders (1 May 2004) ==
Member-state	Votes		Leader	National party	European party
Member-state	^{a}	^{b}	Leader	National party	European party
Germany	10	29	Gerhard Schröder	SPD	PES
United Kingdom	10	29	Tony Blair	Lab	PES
France	10	29	Jacques Chirac	UMP	EPP
Italy	10	29	Silvio Berlusconi	FI	EPP
Spain	8	27	José Luis Rodríguez Zapatero	PSOE	PES
Poland	8	27	Leszek Miller	SLD	PES
Netherlands	5	13	Jan Peter Balkenende	CDA	EPP
Greece	5	12	Kostas Karamanlis	ND	EPP
Czech Republic	5	12	Vladimír Špidla	ČSSD	PES
Belgium	5	12	Guy Verhofstadt	VLD	ELDR
Hungary	5	12	Péter Medgyessy	MSZP	PES
Portugal	5	12	José Manuel Barroso	PPD/PSD	EPP
Sweden	4	10	Göran Persson	SAP	PES
Austria	4	10	Wolfgang Schüssel	ÖVP	EPP
Slovakia	3	7	Mikuláš Dzurinda	SDKÚ	EPP
Denmark	3	7	Anders Fogh Rasmussen	V	ELDR
Finland	3	7	Matti Vanhanen	Kesk.	ELDR
Ireland	3	7	Bertie Ahern	FF	AEN
Lithuania	3	7	Artūras Paulauskas	NS	ELDR
Latvia	3	4	Indulis Emsis	LZP	EGP
Slovenia	3	4	Anton Rop	LDS	ELDR
Estonia	3	4	Juhan Parts	RP	EPP
Cyprus	2	4	Tassos Papadopoulos	DIKO	Independent
Luxembourg	2	4	Jean-Claude Juncker	CSV	EPP
Malta	2	3	Lawrence Gonzi	PN	EPP

DIKO's MEP joined the Alliance of Liberals and Democrats for Europe group in the European Parliament, but the party is not formally attached to any pan-European organization.

== Changes ==
=== Affiliation ===
Date	Member-state	Leader	National party	European party
12 July	Lithuania	Valdas Adamkus	Independent
2 December	Latvia	Aigars Kalvītis	TP	EPP
3 December	Slovenia	Janez Janša	SDS	EPP

=== Office-holder only ===
Date	Member-state	Leader	National party	European party
2 May	Poland	Marek Belka	SLD	PES
17 July	Portugal	Pedro Santana Lopes	PPD/PSD	EPP
4 August	Czech Republic	Stanislav Gross	ČSSD	PES
29 September	Hungary	Ferenc Gyurcsány	MSZP	PES

== See also ==
- Presidency of the Council of the European Union
