= Penrose method =

Method of allocating voting weight by population

The Penrose method (or square-root method) is a method devised in 1946 by Professor Lionel Penrose for allocating the voting weights of delegations (possibly a single representative) in decision-making bodies proportional to the square root of the population represented by this delegation. This is justified by the fact that, due to the square root law of Penrose, the a priori voting power (as defined by the Penrose–Banzhaf index) of a member of a voting body is inversely proportional to the square root of its size. Under certain conditions, this allocation achieves equal voting powers for all people represented, independent of the size of their constituency. Proportional allocation would result in excessive voting powers for the electorates of larger constituencies.

A precondition for the appropriateness of the method is en bloc voting of the delegations in the decision-making body: a delegation cannot split its votes; rather, each delegation has just a single vote to which weights are applied proportional to the square root of the population they represent. Another precondition is that the opinions of the people represented are statistically independent. The representativity of each delegation results from statistical fluctuations within the country, and then, according to Penrose, "small electorates are likely to obtain more representative governments than large electorates." A mathematical formulation of this idea results in the square root rule.

The Penrose method is not currently being used for any notable decision-making body, but it has been proposed for apportioning representation in a United Nations Parliamentary Assembly, and for voting in the Council of the European Union.

== The EU proposal ==
Comparison of voting weights Population in millions as of 1 January 2003
Member state	Population		Nice		Penrose
Germany	82.54m	16.5%	29	8.4%	9.55%
France	59.64m	12.9%	29	8.4%	8.11%
UK	59.33m	12.4%	29	8.4%	8.09%
Italy	57.32m	12.0%	29	8.4%	7.95%
Spain	41.55m	9.0%	27	7.8%	6.78%
Poland	38.22m	7.6%	27	7.8%	6.49%
Romania	21.77m	4.3%	14	4.1%	4.91%
Netherlands	16.19m	3.3%	13	3.8%	4.22%
Greece	11.01m	2.2%	12	3.5%	3.49%
Portugal	10.41m	2.1%	12	3.5%	3.39%
Belgium	10.36m	2.1%	12	3.5%	3.38%
Czech Rep.	10.20m	2.1%	12	3.5%	3.35%
Hungary	10.14m	2.0%	12	3.5%	3.34%
Sweden	8.94m	1.9%	10	2.9%	3.14%
Austria	8.08m	1.7%	10	2.9%	2.98%
Bulgaria	7.85m	1.5%	10	2.9%	2.94%
Denmark	5.38m	1.1%	7	2.0%	2.44%
Slovakia	5.38m	1.1%	7	2.0%	2.44%
Finland	5.21m	1.1%	7	2.0%	2.39%
Ireland	3.96m	0.9%	7	2.0%	2.09%
Lithuania	3.46m	0.7%	7	2.0%	1.95%
Latvia	2.33m	0.5%	4	1.2%	1.61%
Slovenia	2.00m	0.4%	4	1.2%	1.48%
Estonia	1.36m	0.3%	4	1.2%	1.23%
Cyprus	0.72m	0.2%	4	1.2%	0.89%
Luxembourg	0.45m	0.1%	4	1.2%	0.70%
Malta	0.40m	0.1%	3	0.9%	0.66%
EU	484.20m	100%	345	100%	100%

The Penrose method became revitalised within the European Union when it was proposed by Sweden in 2003 amid negotiations on the Amsterdam Treaty and by Poland June 2007 during summit on the Treaty of Lisbon. In this context, the method was proposed to compute voting weights of member states in the Council of the European Union.

Currently, the voting in the Council of the EU does not follow the Penrose method. Instead, the rules of the Nice Treaty are effective between 2004 and 2014, under certain conditions until 2017. The associated voting weights are compared in the adjacent table along with the population data of the member states.

Besides the voting weight, the voting power (i.e., the Penrose–Banzhaf index) of a member state also depends on the threshold percentage needed to make a decision. Smaller percentages work in favor of larger states. For example, if one state has 30% of the total voting weights while the threshold for decision making is at 29%, this state will have 100% voting power (i.e., an index of 1). For the EU-27, an optimal threshold, at which the voting powers of all citizens in any member state are almost equal, has been computed at about 61.6%. After the university of the authors of this paper, this system is referred to as the "Jagiellonian Compromise". Optimal threshold decreases with the number $M$ of the member states as $1/2 +1/\sqrt{\pi M}$.

== The UN proposal ==
According to INFUSA, "The square-root method is more than a pragmatic compromise between the extreme methods of world representation unrelated to population size and allocation of national quotas in direct proportion to population size; Penrose showed that in terms of statistical theory the square-root method gives to each voter in the world an equal influence on decision-making in a world assembly".

Under the Penrose method, the relative voting weights of the most populous countries are lower than their proportion of the world population. In the table below, the countries' voting weights are computed as the square root of their year-2005 population in millions. This procedure was originally published by Penrose in 1946 based on pre-World War II population figures.

		Population as of 2005	Percent of world population	Voting weight	Percent of total weight
	World	6,434,577,575	100.00%	721.32	100.00%
Rank	Country				
1	People's Republic of China	1,306,313,812	20.30%	36.14	5.01%
2	India	1,080,264,388	16.79%	32.87	4.56%
3	United States of America	297,200,000	4.62%	17.24	2.39%
4	Indonesia	241,973,879	3.76%	15.56	2.16%
5	Brazil	186,112,794	2.89%	13.64	1.89%
6	Pakistan	162,419,946	2.52%	12.74	1.77%
7	Bangladesh	144,319,628	2.24%	12.01	1.67%
8	Russia	143,420,309	2.23%	11.98	1.66%
9	Nigeria	128,771,988	2.00%	11.35	1.57%
10	Japan	127,417,244	1.98%	11.29	1.56%
11	Mexico	106,202,903	1.65%	10.31	1.43%
12	Philippines	87,857,473	1.37%	9.37	1.30%
13	Vietnam	83,535,576	1.30%	9.14	1.27%
14	Germany	82,468,000	1.28%	9.08	1.26%
15	Egypt	77,505,756	1.20%	8.80	1.22%
16	Ethiopia	73,053,286	1.14%	8.55	1.18%
17	Turkey	69,660,559	1.08%	8.35	1.16%
18	Iran	68,017,860	1.06%	8.25	1.14%
19	Thailand	65,444,371	1.02%	8.09	1.12%
20	France	60,656,178	0.94%	7.79	1.08%
21	United Kingdom	60,441,457	0.94%	7.77	1.08%
22	Democratic Republic of the Congo	60,085,804	0.93%	7.75	1.07%
23	Italy	58,103,033	0.90%	7.62	1.06%
24	South Korea	48,422,644	0.75%	6.96	0.96%
25	Ukraine	47,425,336	0.74%	6.89	0.95%
26	South Africa	44,344,136	0.69%	6.66	0.92%
27	Spain	43,209,511	0.67%	6.57	0.91%
28	Colombia	42,954,279	0.67%	6.55	0.91%
29	Myanmar	42,909,464	0.67%	6.55	0.91%
30	Sudan	40,187,486	0.62%	6.34	0.88%
31	Argentina	39,537,943	0.61%	6.29	0.87%
32	Poland	38,635,144	0.60%	6.22	0.86%
33	Tanzania	36,766,356	0.57%	6.06	0.84%
34	Kenya	33,829,590	0.53%	5.82	0.81%
35	Canada	32,400,000	0.50%	5.69	0.79%
36	Morocco	32,725,847	0.51%	5.72	0.79%
37	Algeria	32,531,853	0.51%	5.70	0.79%
38	Afghanistan	29,928,987	0.47%	5.47	0.76%
39	Peru	27,925,628	0.43%	5.28	0.73%
40	Nepal	27,676,547	0.43%	5.26	0.73%
41	Uganda	27,269,482	0.42%	5.22	0.72%
42	Uzbekistan	26,851,195	0.42%	5.18	0.72%
43	Saudi Arabia	26,417,599	0.41%	5.14	0.71%
44	Malaysia	26,207,102	0.41%	5.12	0.71%
45	Iraq	26,074,906	0.41%	5.11	0.71%
46	Venezuela	25,375,281	0.39%	5.04	0.70%
47	North Korea	22,912,177	0.36%	4.79	0.66%
48	Republic of China	22,894,384	0.36%	4.78	0.66%
49	Romania	22,329,977	0.35%	4.73	0.66%
50	Ghana	21,029,853	0.33%	4.59	0.64%
51	Yemen	20,727,063	0.32%	4.55	0.63%
52	Australia	20,229,800	0.31%	4.50	0.62%
53	Sri Lanka	20,064,776	0.31%	4.48	0.62%
54	Mozambique	19,406,703	0.30%	4.41	0.61%
55	Syria	18,448,752	0.29%	4.30	0.60%
56	Madagascar	18,040,341	0.28%	4.25	0.59%
57	Côte d'Ivoire	17,298,040	0.27%	4.16	0.58%
58	Netherlands	16,407,491	0.25%	4.05	0.56%
59	Cameroon	16,380,005	0.25%	4.05	0.56%
60	Chile	16,267,278	0.25%	4.03	0.56%
61	Kazakhstan	15,185,844	0.24%	3.90	0.54%
62	Guatemala	14,655,189	0.23%	3.83	0.53%
63	Burkina Faso	13,925,313	0.22%	3.73	0.52%
64	Cambodia	13,607,069	0.21%	3.69	0.51%
65	Ecuador	13,363,593	0.21%	3.66	0.51%
66	Zimbabwe	12,746,990	0.20%	3.57	0.49%
67	Mali	12,291,529	0.19%	3.51	0.49%
68	Malawi	12,158,924	0.19%	3.49	0.48%
69	Niger	11,665,937	0.18%	3.42	0.47%
70	Cuba	11,346,670	0.18%	3.37	0.47%
71	Zambia	11,261,795	0.18%	3.36	0.47%
72	Angola	11,190,786	0.17%	3.35	0.46%
73	Senegal	11,126,832	0.17%	3.34	0.46%
74	Serbia and Montenegro	10,829,175	0.17%	3.29	0.46%
75	Greece	10,668,354	0.17%	3.27	0.45%
76	Portugal	10,566,212	0.16%	3.25	0.45%
77	Belgium	10,364,388	0.16%	3.22	0.45%
78	Belarus	10,300,483	0.16%	3.21	0.44%
79	Czech Republic	10,241,138	0.16%	3.20	0.44%
80	Hungary	10,081,000	0.16%	3.18	0.44%
81	Tunisia	10,074,951	0.16%	3.17	0.44%
82	Chad	9,826,419	0.15%	3.13	0.43%
83	Guinea	9,467,866	0.15%	3.08	0.43%
84	Sweden	9,001,774	0.14%	3.00	0.42%
85	Dominican Republic	8,950,034	0.14%	2.99	0.41%
86	Bolivia	8,857,870	0.14%	2.98	0.41%
87	Somalia	8,591,629	0.13%	2.93	0.41%
88	Rwanda	8,440,820	0.13%	2.91	0.40%
89	Austria	8,184,691	0.13%	2.86	0.40%
90	Haiti	8,121,622	0.13%	2.85	0.40%
91	Azerbaijan	7,911,974	0.12%	2.81	0.39%
92	Switzerland	7,489,370	0.12%	2.74	0.38%
93	Benin	7,460,025	0.12%	2.73	0.38%
94	Bulgaria	7,450,349	0.12%	2.73	0.38%
95	Tajikistan	7,163,506	0.11%	2.68	0.37%
96	Honduras	6,975,204	0.11%	2.64	0.37%
97	Israel	6,955,000	0.11%	2.64	0.37%
98	El Salvador	6,704,932	0.10%	2.59	0.36%
99	Burundi	6,370,609	0.10%	2.52	0.35%
100	Paraguay	6,347,884	0.10%	2.52	0.35%
101	Laos	6,217,141	0.10%	2.49	0.35%
102	Sierra Leone	6,017,643	0.09%	2.45	0.34%
103	Libya	5,765,563	0.09%	2.40	0.33%
104	Jordan	5,759,732	0.09%	2.40	0.33%
105	Togo	5,681,519	0.09%	2.38	0.33%
106	Papua New Guinea	5,545,268	0.09%	2.35	0.33%
107	Nicaragua	5,465,100	0.08%	2.34	0.32%
108	Denmark	5,432,335	0.08%	2.33	0.32%
109	Slovakia	5,431,363	0.08%	2.33	0.32%
110	Finland	5,223,442	0.08%	2.29	0.32%
111	Kyrgyzstan	5,146,281	0.08%	2.27	0.31%
112	Turkmenistan	4,952,081	0.08%	2.23	0.31%
113	Georgia	4,677,401	0.07%	2.16	0.30%
114	Norway	4,593,041	0.07%	2.14	0.30%
115	Eritrea	4,561,599	0.07%	2.14	0.30%
116	Croatia	4,495,904	0.07%	2.12	0.29%
117	Moldova	4,455,421	0.07%	2.11	0.29%
118	Singapore	4,425,720	0.07%	2.10	0.29%
119	Ireland	4,130,700	0.06%	2.03	0.28%
120	New Zealand	4,098,200	0.06%	2.02	0.28%
121	Bosnia and Herzegovina	4,025,476	0.06%	2.01	0.28%
122	Costa Rica	4,016,173	0.06%	2.00	0.28%
123	Lebanon	3,826,018	0.06%	1.96	0.27%
124	Central African Republic	3,799,897	0.06%	1.95	0.27%
125	Lithuania	3,596,617	0.06%	1.90	0.26%
126	Albania	3,563,112	0.06%	1.89	0.26%
127	Liberia	3,482,211	0.05%	1.87	0.26%
128	Uruguay	3,415,920	0.05%	1.85	0.26%
129	Mauritania	3,086,859	0.05%	1.76	0.24%
130	Panama	3,039,150	0.05%	1.74	0.24%
131	Republic of the Congo	3,039,126	0.05%	1.74	0.24%
132	Oman	3,001,583	0.05%	1.73	0.24%
133	Armenia	2,982,904	0.05%	1.73	0.24%
134	Mongolia	2,791,272	0.04%	1.67	0.23%
135	Jamaica	2,731,832	0.04%	1.65	0.23%
136	United Arab Emirates	2,563,212	0.04%	1.60	0.22%
137	Kuwait	2,335,648	0.04%	1.53	0.21%
138	Latvia	2,290,237	0.04%	1.51	0.21%
139	Bhutan	2,232,291	0.03%	1.49	0.21%
140	Macedonia	2,045,262	0.03%	1.43	0.20%
141	Namibia	2,030,692	0.03%	1.43	0.20%
142	Slovenia	2,011,070	0.03%	1.42	0.20%
143	Lesotho	1,867,035	0.03%	1.37	0.19%
144	Botswana	1,640,115	0.03%	1.28	0.18%
145	The Gambia	1,593,256	0.02%	1.26	0.17%
146	Guinea-Bissau	1,416,027	0.02%	1.19	0.16%
147	Gabon	1,389,201	0.02%	1.18	0.16%
148	Estonia	1,332,893	0.02%	1.15	0.16%
149	Mauritius	1,230,602	0.02%	1.11	0.15%
150	Swaziland	1,173,900	0.02%	1.08	0.15%
151	Trinidad and Tobago	1,088,644	0.02%	1.04	0.14%
152	East Timor	1,040,880	0.02%	1.02	0.14%
153	Fiji	893,354	0.01%	0.95	0.13%
154	Qatar	863,051	0.01%	0.93	0.13%
155	Cyprus	780,133	0.01%	0.88	0.12%
156	Guyana	765,283	0.01%	0.87	0.12%
157	Bahrain	688,345	0.01%	0.83	0.12%
158	Comoros	671,247	0.01%	0.82	0.11%
159	Solomon Islands	538,032	0.01%	0.73	0.10%
160	Equatorial Guinea	535,881	0.01%	0.73	0.10%
161	Djibouti	476,703	0.01%	0.69	0.10%
162	Luxembourg	468,571	0.01%	0.68	0.09%
163	Suriname	438,144	0.01%	0.66	0.09%
164	Cape Verde	418,224	0.01%	0.65	0.09%
165	Malta	398,534	0.01%	0.63	0.09%
166	Brunei	372,361	0.01%	0.61	0.08%
167	Maldives	349,106	0.01%	0.59	0.08%
168	The Bahamas	301,790	0.005%	0.55	0.08%
169	Iceland	296,737	0.005%	0.54	0.08%
170	Belize	279,457	0.004%	0.53	0.07%
171	Barbados	279,254	0.004%	0.53	0.07%
172	Vanuatu	205,754	0.003%	0.45	0.06%
173	São Tomé and Príncipe	187,410	0.003%	0.43	0.06%
174	Samoa	177,287	0.003%	0.42	0.06%
175	Saint Lucia	166,312	0.003%	0.41	0.06%
176	Saint Vincent and the Grenadines	117,534	0.002%	0.34	0.05%
177	Tonga	112,422	0.002%	0.34	0.05%
178	Federated States of Micronesia	108,105	0.002%	0.33	0.05%
179	Kiribati	103,092	0.002%	0.32	0.04%
180	Grenada	89,502	0.001%	0.30	0.04%
181	Seychelles	81,188	0.001%	0.28	0.04%
182	Andorra	70,549	0.001%	0.27	0.04%
183	Dominica	69,029	0.001%	0.26	0.04%
184	Antigua and Barbuda	68,722	0.001%	0.26	0.04%
185	Marshall Islands	59,071	0.001%	0.24	0.03%
186	Saint Kitts and Nevis	38,958	0.001%	0.20	0.03%
187	Liechtenstein	33,717	0.001%	0.18	0.03%
188	Monaco	32,409	0.001%	0.18	0.02%
189	San Marino	28,880	0.0004%	0.17	0.02%
190	Palau	20,303	0.0003%	0.14	0.02%
191	Nauru	13,048	0.0002%	0.11	0.02%
192	Tuvalu	11,636	0.0002%	0.11	0.01%
193	Vatican City	921	0.00001%	0.03	0.004%

== Criticisms ==
It has been claimed that the Penrose square root law is limited to votes for which public opinion is equally divided for and against. A study of various elections has shown that this equally-divided scenario is not typical; these elections suggested that voting weights should be distributed according to the 0.9 power of the number of voters represented (in contrast to the 0.5 power used in the Penrose method).

In practice, the theoretical possibility of the decisiveness of a single vote is questionable. Elections results that come close to a tie are likely to be legally challenged, as was the case in the US presidential election in Florida in 2000, which suggests that no single vote is pivotal.

In addition, a minor technical issue is that the theoretical argument for allocation of voting weight is based on the possibility that an individual has a deciding vote in each representative's area. This scenario is only possible when each representative has an odd number of voters in their area.

== See also ==
- List of countries by population
