= Shapley–Shubik power index =

Voting power index based on pivotal probability

The Shapley–Shubik power index (SSPI) is a measure of a participant’s a priori voting power in a decision-making body. It was introduced by Lloyd S. Shapley and Martin Shubik in 1954 as an application of the Shapley value from cooperative game theory to simple yes–no voting games. The index assigns to each player the probability of being pivotal—that is, the first to turn a losing coalition into a winning one—over all possible orderings of voters.

== Definition ==
Let there be n voters with weights (possibly all 1) and a quota q for passage. For any permutation (ordering) of the voters, the pivotal voter is the first whose addition to the running total weakly meets q. The Shapley–Shubik index for voter i is the fraction of all n! permutations in which i is pivotal; indices sum to 1 across voters.

== Mathematical formulation ==
Let $N$ be the voter set and $v(S)\in\{0,1\}$ indicate whether coalition $S\subseteq N$ is winning. Under the assumption that $v$ is a simple, monotone voting function, the Shapley-Shubik value obeys the following equation. For player $i$,

$\varphi_i=\frac{1}{n!}\sum_{\pi\in\Pi}\big[\,v(P_i^\pi\cup\{i\})-v(P_i^\pi)\,\big]$

where $\Pi$ is the set of all permutations of $N$ and $P_i^{\pi}$ is the set of players preceding $i$ in permutation $\pi$. The bracketed term is 1 iff $i$ is pivotal in $\pi$.

== Historical background ==
Shapley and Shubik’s original 1954 paper introduced the index as a way to quantify individual influence in committees, parliaments, and other decision-making bodies. Their work built on cooperative game theory and the Shapley value, adapting it for monotonic binary voting games. Subsequent research expanded the theory, connected it to other power indices, and applied it to legislative design, corporate governance, and international organizations.

== Properties ==
The SSPI satisfies standard axioms for power measures in simple, monotone games (also called simple voting games):

- Efficiency: $\sum_{i\in N}\varphi_i=1$.
- Symmetry: equally situated voters have equal indices.
- Dummy: a voter who never turns any losing coalition into a winner has index 0.
- Additivity/transfer: behavior is consistent under sums of games.

It is sensitive to both the quota and the distribution of weights. Unlike the Banzhaf power index, which averages over coalitions, SSPI averages over orderings and therefore embeds an ordering-based notion of pivotality.

== Worked examples ==
=== Four-member weighted body ===
Let weights be A=3, B=2, C=1, D=1 with quota q=4. Enumerating the 24 permutations shows A pivotal in 12, and each of B, C, D pivotal in 4. Thus A has 0.50, while B=C=D=1/6.

=== Shareholder meeting ===
With shares (40, 30, 30) and q=51, the pivotal-probability rule yields indices (0.50, 0.25, 0.25). The largest shareholder’s influence exceeds proportional ownership.

=== Supermajority example ===
For five equal voters and q=4 (a 4/5 supermajority), each voter’s index equals 0.2: symmetry implies equal power even under a high quota, though actual passage rates drop.

== Computational complexity and algorithms ==
Direct enumeration uses n! permutations. For weighted majority games, dynamic programming over weight sums reduces computation to pseudo-polynomial time O(n·W), where W is the total weight, or O(n·2^n) over coalitions; sampling methods estimate indices with probabilistic error bounds. Computing Shapley-value-based indices in general cooperative games is #P-complete, implying no polynomial-time algorithm exists unless P=#P.

== Applications ==
- Legislatures and councils. SSPI is used to quantify influence under different seat allocations and quotas, including supermajorities and veto rules.
- International organizations. Analyses of the United Nations Security Council and the Council of the European Union compare permanent-member veto power and weighted voting under treaty reforms.
- Corporate governance. Shareholder power under dual-class structures or staggered thresholds can diverge substantially from proportional ownership.
- Constitutional and institutional design. Designers assess how proposed rule changes (quotas, membership, weights) affect ex ante influence before adoption.

== Variants and extensions ==
Researchers have extended the index to settings with abstention, probabilistic approval, communication structures, and hierarchical or multiple-issue games; the SSPI appears as a special case of the Shapley value under simple games and uniform ordering probabilities. Methods based on the multilinear extension and marginal-contribution distributions provide efficient approximations in large electorates.

== Comparison with other indices ==
Compared with the Banzhaf index, SSPI weights permutations rather than coalitions; when all coalitions are equally likely and players are independent, the two measures can diverge, particularly under extreme quotas or skewed weights. Deegan–Packel and Johnston indices emphasize minimal winning coalitions and criticality patterns, offering alternative normative interpretations.

== Criticism and limitations ==
The SSPI assumes (i) all orderings are equally likely and (ii) players vote independently of preferences, parties, or agenda control. Real-world bodies can violate these assumptions via party discipline, procedural rules, logrolling, or agenda setting, making ex post influence differ from ex ante power. Nonetheless, the index remains a benchmark because it is axiomatic, transparent, and comparable across designs.

== Current research and debates ==
Recent work studies (a) scalable Monte-Carlo estimators with confidence guarantees, (b) correlated or strategic voting models, (c) robustness of power under membership changes, and (d) computational social-choice “control” problems that seek to alter an actor’s power by adding or removing players or weight—many of which are computationally intractable (e.g., NP^PP-complete).

== Examples ==
Suppose decisions are made by majority rule in a body consisting of A, B, C, D, who have 3, 2, 1 and 1 votes, respectively. The majority vote threshold is 4. There are 4! = 24 possible orders for these members to vote:

A**B**CD	A**B**DC	A**C**BD	A**C**DB	A**D**BC	A**D**CB
B**A**CD	B**A**DC	BC**A**D	BC**D**A	BD**A**C	BD**C**A
C**A**BD	C**A**DB	CB**A**D	CB**D**A	CD**A**B	CD**B**A
D**A**BC	D**A**CB	DB**A**C	DB**C**A	DC**A**B	DC**B**A

For each voting sequence the pivot voter – that voter who first raises the cumulative sum to 4 or more – is bolded. Here, A is pivotal in 12 of the 24 sequences. Therefore, A has an index of power 1/2. The others have an index of power 1/6. Curiously, B has no more power than C and D. When you consider that A's vote determines the outcome unless the others unite against A, it becomes clear that B, C, D play identical roles. This reflects in the power indices.

Suppose that in another majority-rule voting body with $n+1$ members, in which a single strong member has $k$ votes and the remaining $n$ members have one vote each. In this case the strong member has a power index of $\dfrac{k}{n+1}$ (unless $k > n+1$, in which case the power index is simply $1$). Note that this is more than the fraction of votes which the strong member commands. Indeed, this strong member has only a fraction $\dfrac{k}{n+k}$ of the votes. Consider, for instance, a company which has 1000 outstanding shares of voting stock. One large shareholder holds 400 shares, while 600 other shareholders hold 1 share each. This corresponds to $n = 600$ and $k=400$. In this case the power index of the large shareholder is approximately 0.666 (or 66.6%), even though this shareholder holds only 40% of the stock. The remaining 600 shareholder have a power index of less than 0.0006 (or 0.06%). Thus, the large shareholder holds over 1000 times more voting power as each other shareholder, while holding only 400 times as much stock.

The above can be mathematically derived as follows. Note that a majority is reached if at least $t(n, k) = \left\lfloor\dfrac{n+k}{2}\right\rfloor + 1$ votes are cast in favor. If $k \geq n+1$, the strong member clearly holds all the power, since in this case $k \geq t(n, k)$ (i.e., the votes of the strong member alone meet the majority threshold). Suppose now that $k \leq n+1$ and that in a randomly chosen voting sequence, the strong member votes as the $r$th member. This means that after the first $r-1$ member have voted, $r-1$ votes have been cast in favor, while after the first $r$ members have voted, $r-1+k$ votes have been cast in favor. The vote of strong member is pivotal if the former does not meet the majority threshold, while the latter does. That is, $r-1 < t(n, k)$, and $r-1+k \geq t(n, k)$. We can rewrite this condition as $t(n,k) + 1 - k \leq r < t(n,k) + 1$. Note that our condition of $k \leq n+1$ ensures that $1 \leq t(n,k) + 1 - k$ and $t(n,k) + 1 \leq n + 2$ (i.e., all of the permitted values of $r$ are feasible). Thus, the strong member is the pivotal voter if $r$ takes on one of the $k$ values of $t(n, k) + 1 - k$ up to but not including $t(n,k) + 1$. Since each of the $n+1$ possible values of $r$ is associated with the same number of voting sequences, this means that the strong member is the pivotal voter in a fraction $\dfrac{k}{n+1}$ of the voting sequences. That is, the power index of the strong member is $\dfrac{k}{n+1}$.

== Applications ==
The index has been applied to the analysis of voting in the Council of the European Union.

The index has been applied to the analysis of voting in the United Nations Security Council. The UN Security Council is made up of fifteen member states, of which five (the United States of America, Russia, China, France and the United Kingdom) are permanent members of the council. For a motion to pass in the Council, it needs the support of every permanent member and the support of four non permanent members. This is equivalent to a voting body where the five permanent members have eight votes each, the ten other members have one vote each and there is a quota of forty four votes, as then there would be fifty total votes, so you need all five permanent members and then four other votes for a motion to pass. Note that a non-permanent member is pivotal in a permutation if and only if they are in the ninth position to vote and all five permanent members have already voted. Suppose that we have a permutation in which a non-permanent member is pivotal. Then there are three non-permanent members and five permanent that have to come before this pivotal member in this permutation. Therefore, there are $\textstyle\binom 9 3$ ways of choosing these members and so 8! × $\textstyle\binom 9 3$ different orders of the members before the pivotal voter. There would then be 6! ways of choosing the remaining voters after the pivotal voter. As there are a total of 15! permutations of 15 voters, the Shapley-Shubik power index of a non-permanent member is: $\frac{\binom{9}{3} (8!) (6!)}{15!} = \frac{4}{2145}$. Hence the power index of a permanent member is $\frac{421}{2145}$.

== Python implementation ==
This is a simple implementation of the above example in Python.

from math import factorial, floor

def normalize(x):
    total = sum(x)
    return [float(x) / total for x in x]
	
def enumerate_coalitions(n):
    if n == 0:
        yield []
    else:
        for coalition in enumerate_coalitions(n - 1):
            yield coalition
            yield coalition + [n]
	
def power_index(seats: list[int], threshold=None) -> list[float]:
    """Shapley–Shubik power index."""
    if threshold is None:
        threshold = floor(sum(seats) / 2) + 1
    result = [0] * len(seats)
    for coalition in enumerate_coalitions(len(seats) - 1):
        for pivot in range(len(seats)):
            coalition_seats = sum(seats[(pivot + i) % len(seats)] for i in coalition)
            if (coalition_seats < threshold and threshold <= coalition_seats + seats[pivot]):
                result[pivot] += factorial(len(coalition)) * factorial(len(seats) - len(coalition) - 1)
    return normalize(result)

print(power_index([3, 2, 1, 1]))

== See also ==
- Shapley value
- Arrow theorem
- Banzhaf power index
- Weighted voting system
- Authority distribution
