= Voting in the Council of the European Union =

Method to take decisions in the EU Council

The procedures for voting in the Council of the European Union are described in the treaties of the European Union. The Council of the European Union (or simply "Council" or "Council of Ministers") has had its voting procedure amended by subsequent treaties and currently operates on the system set forth in the Treaty of Lisbon. The system is known as qualified majority voting is a type of consociational democracy.

== Current qualified majority voting rules (since 2014) ==
Article 16 of the Treaty on European Union, as amended by the Treaty of Lisbon, stipulates that the Council voting arrangements of the Nice Treaty applied until 31 October 2014. (Note: However, any member state could request that the Nice system still be used for a particular vote, until 31 March 2017.)

=== Qualified majority ===
Article 16 also states the conditions for a qualified majority, effective since 1 November 2014:

- Majority of countries: 55% (comprising at least 15 of them) and
- Majority of population: 65%.

A blocking minority requires—in addition to not meeting one of the two conditions above—that at least 4 countries (or, if not all countries participate in the vote, the minimum number of countries representing more than 35% of the population of the participating countries, plus one country) vote against the proposal. Thus, there may be cases where an act is passed, even though the population condition is not met. This precludes scenarios where 3 populous countries could block a decision favored by the other 24 countries.

According to the EU Regulation No 1260/2013 the usually resident population are "all persons having their usual residence in a Member State" irrespective of European Union citizenship.

The Lisbon rules eradicated the use of "artificial" voting weights. This move, first proposed in the Constitution, is based on the size of populations and, at the same time, acknowledges the smaller member states' fears of being overruled by the larger countries.

=== Reinforced qualified majority ===
Article 238 of the Treaty on the Functioning of the European Union states the conditions for a reinforced qualified majority, when acting on a proposal from neither the Commission nor the High Representative, effective since 1 November 2014:

- Majority of countries: 72% and
- Majority of population: 65%.

=== Voting practice ===
In practice, the Council targeted unanimous decisions, and qualified majority voting was often simply used as a means to pressure compromises for consensus. For example, in 2008, 128 out of 147 Council decisions were unanimous. Within the remaining decisions, there was a total of 32 abstentions and 8 votes against the respective decision. These opposing votes were cast twice by Luxembourg and once by each of Austria, Belgium, Denmark, Spain, Netherlands, and Portugal.

=== Policy areas ===
The Council, jointly with the European Parliament, has policy-making, legislative and budgetary functions. The Council is composed of the ministers of member states responsible for a specific area of policy. The ministers or their representative will commit the government of the member state in questions of policy and cast the member state vote. The Lisbon Treaty specifies in Article 16 that the Council shall act by a qualified majority voting (QMV) in areas of competence with certain exceptions. Qualified majority voting now extends to policy areas that required unanimity according to the Nice Treaty.

The new areas of QMV are:

Area	Nice	Lisbon	Reference
Initiatives of the High Representative for Foreign Affairs	Unanimity	QMV following unanimous request	15b TEU
Rules concerning the European Defence Agency	Unanimity	QMV	45(2) TEU
Freedom to establish a business	Unanimity	QMV	50 TFEU
Self-employment access rights	Unanimity	QMV	50 TFEU
Freedom, security and justice – cooperation and evaluation	Unanimity	QMV	70 TFEU
Border checks	Unanimity	QMV	77 TFEU
Asylum	Unanimity	QMV	78 TFEU
Immigration	Unanimity	QMV	79 TFEU
Crime prevention incentives	Unanimity	QMV	69c TFEU
Eurojust	Unanimity	QMV	69d TFEU
Police cooperation	Unanimity	QMV	69f TFEU
Europol	Unanimity	QMV	69g TFEU
Transport	Unanimity	QMV	71§2 TFEU
European Central Bank	Unanimity	QMV (in part)	129 TFEU, 283 TFEU
Culture	Unanimity	QMV	151 TFEU
Structural and Cohension Funds	Unanimity	QMV	161 TFEU
Organisation of the Council of the European Union	Unanimity	QMV	201b TFEU
European Court of Justice	Unanimity	QMV	245, 224a, 225a TFEU
Freedom of movement for workers	Unanimity	QMV	46 TFEU
Social security	Unanimity	QMV	48 TFEU
Criminal judicial cooperation	Unanimity	QMV	69a TFEU
Criminal law	Unanimity	QMV	69b TFEU
President of the European Council election	(New item)	QMV	9b§5 TEU
Foreign Affairs High Representative election	(New item)	QMV	9e§1 TEU
Funding the Common Foreign and Security Policy	Unanimity	QMV	28 TEU
Common defense policy	Unanimity	QMV	28e TEU
Withdrawal of a member state	(new item)	QMV	49a TEU
General economic interest services	Unanimity	QMV	16 TFEU
Diplomatic and consular protection	Unanimity	QMV	20 TFEU
Citizens initiative regulations	Unanimity	QMV	21 TFEU
Intellectual property	Unanimity	QMV	97a TFEU
Eurozone external representation	Unanimity	QMV	115c TFEU
Sport	Unanimity	QMV	149 TFEU
Space	Unanimity	QMV	172a TFEU
Energy	Unanimity	QMV	176a TFEU
Tourism	Unanimity	QMV	176b TFEU
Civil protection	Unanimity	QMV	176c TFEU
Administrative cooperation	Unanimity	QMV	176d TFEU
Emergency international aid	Unanimity	QMV	188i TFEU
Humanitarian aid	Unanimity	QMV	188j TFEU
Response to natural disasters or terrorism	(new item)	QMV	188R§3 TFEU
Economic and Social Committee	QMV	QMV	256a TFEU
Committee of the Regions	Unanimity	QMV	256a TFEU
Economic and Social Committee	Unanimity	QMV	256a TFEU
The EU budget	Unanimity	QMV	269 TFEU

== Past qualified majority voting rules (1958–2014) ==
This section presents the former qualified majority voting systems employed in the Council of the European Union, and its predecessor institutions. While some policy areas require unanimity among Council members, for selected policy areas qualified majority voting has existed right from the start. All major treaties have shifted some policy areas from unanimity to qualified majority voting.

Whenever the community was enlarged, voting weights for new members were defined and thresholds re-adjusted by accession treaties. After its inception in 1958, the most notable changes to the voting system occurred:

- with the 1973 enlargement, when the number of votes for the largest member states was increased from 4 to 10,
- with the Treaty of Nice, when the maximum number of votes was increased to 29, thresholds became defined in terms of percentages, and a direct population-dependent condition was introduced,
- with the Treaty of Lisbon, when the concept of votes was abandoned in favour of a "double majority" depending only on the number of states and the population represented.

All systems prescribed higher thresholds for passing acts that were not proposed by the Commission. Member states have to cast their votes en bloc (i.e., a member state may not split its votes). Hence, the number of votes rather describes the weight of a member's single vote.

The analysis of the distribution of voting power under different voting rules in the EU Council often requires the use of complex computational methods that go beyond a mere calculation of vote share, such as the Shapley-Shubik index or the Banzhaf measure.

=== Treaty of Rome (1958–1973) ===
According to Article 148 of the Treaty establishing the European Economic Community (EEC Treaty), acts of the Council required for their adoption:

- 12 votes (if the act was proposed by the Commission), or
- 12 votes by at least 4 member states (if the act was not proposed by the Commission).

The values above are related to the EU-6, the founding member states. The treaty allocated the votes as follows:

- 4 votes: France, Germany, Italy,
- 2 votes: Belgium, Netherlands,
- 1 vote: Luxembourg.

Under this system, Luxembourg had no voting power for acts proposed by the Commission.

=== Accession Treaty (1973–1981) ===
Article 148 of the EEC Treaty, specifying the qualified majority voting system of the Council, was amended by Article 8 of the Accession Treaty regulating the enlargement of the community by Denmark, Ireland, and the United Kingdom. Acts of the Council now required for their adoption:

- 41 votes (if the act was proposed by the Commission), or
- 41 votes by at least 6 member states (if the act was not proposed by the Commission).

These values were now related to the EU-9. The treaty allocated the votes as follows:

- 10 votes: France, Germany, Italy, United Kingdom,
- 5 votes: Belgium, Netherlands,
- 3 votes: Denmark, Ireland,
- 2 votes: Luxembourg.

=== Accession Treaty (1981–1986) ===
Article 148 of the EEC Treaty, specifying the qualified majority voting system of the Council, was amended by Article 14 of the Accession Treaty regulating the enlargement of the community by Greece. Acts of the Council now required for their adoption:

- 45 votes (if the act was proposed by the Commission), or
- 45 votes by at least 6 member states (if the act was not proposed by the Commission).

The votes allocated previously to the EU-9 did not change. Greece was allocated 5 votes.

=== Accession Treaty (1986–1995) ===
Article 148 of the EEC Treaty, specifying the qualified majority voting system of the Council, was amended by Article 14 of the Accession Treaty regulating the enlargement of the community by Portugal and Spain. Acts of the Council now required for their adoption:

- 54 votes (if the act was proposed by the Commission), or
- 54 votes by at least 8 member states (if the act was not proposed by the Commission).

The votes allocated previously to the EU-10 did not change. To the new members, the following votes were allocated:

- 8 votes: Spain,
- 5 votes: Portugal.

The Treaty of Maastricht established the European Community Treaty (EC Treaty) where the qualified majority voting system was detailed in Article 148. While this treaty transferred some policy areas subject to unanimity to qualified majority, it neither changed the voting weights nor the thresholds.

=== Accession Treaty (1995–2004) ===
Article 148 of the EC Treaty, specifying the qualified majority voting system of the Council, was amended by Article 8 of the Accession Treaty regulating the enlargement of the community by Austria, Finland, and Sweden. Acts of the Council now required for their adoption:

- 62 votes (if the act was proposed by the Commission), or
- 62 votes by at least 10 member states (if the act was not proposed by the Commission).

The votes allocated previously to the EU-12 did not change. To the new members, the following votes were allocated:

- 4 votes: Austria, Sweden,
- 3 votes: Finland.

=== Treaty of Nice (2004–2014/17) ===
Comparison of voting weights Population in millions as of 1 January 2003 (Treaty of Nice)
Member state	Population		Weights		Penrose
Germany	82.54m	16.5%	29	8.4%	9.55%
France	59.64m	12.9%	29	8.4%	8.11%
UK	59.33m	12.4%	29	8.4%	8.09%
Italy	57.32m	12.0%	29	8.4%	7.95%
Spain	41.55m	9.0%	27	7.8%	6.78%
Poland	38.22m	7.6%	27	7.8%	6.49%
Romania	21.77m	4.3%	14	4.1%	4.91%
Netherlands	17,02m	3.3%	13	3.8%	4.22%
Greece	11.01m	2.2%	12	3.5%	3.49%
Portugal	10.41m	2.1%	12	3.5%	3.39%
Belgium	10.36m	2.1%	12	3.5%	3.38%
Czech Rep.	10.20m	2.1%	12	3.5%	3.35%
Hungary	10.14m	2.0%	12	3.5%	3.34%
Sweden	8.94m	1.9%	10	2.9%	3.14%
Austria	8.08m	1.7%	10	2.9%	2.98%
Bulgaria	7.85m	1.5%	10	2.9%	2.94%
Denmark	5.38m	1.1%	7	2.0%	2.44%
Slovakia	5.38m	1.1%	7	2.0%	2.44%
Finland	5.21m	1.1%	7	2.0%	2.39%
Ireland	3.96m	0.9%	7	2.0%	2.09%
Lithuania	3.46m	0.7%	7	2.0%	1.95%
Latvia	2.33m	0.5%	4	1.2%	1.61%
Slovenia	2.00m	0.4%	4	1.2%	1.48%
Estonia	1.36m	0.3%	4	1.2%	1.23%
Cyprus	0.72m	0.2%	4	1.2%	0.89%
Luxembourg	0.45m	0.1%	4	1.2%	0.70%
Malta	0.40m	0.1%	3	0.9%	0.66%
EU	484.20m	100%	345	100%	100%

The voting system of the Council as defined in the Treaty of Nice was supposed to enter into force on 1 January 2005. However, the voting system was changed before that date by the Treaty of Accession 2003, which entered into force on 1 May 2004. During a temporary period that extended to 1 November 2004, the old pre-Nice voting system was kept, but adapted to the new number of member states. From 1 November 2004, a new voting system based on the Nice system entered into force. The voting weights of the member states according to that voting system are shown in the table on the right. The voting system was replaced by the Treaty of Lisbon, effective 1 November 2014.

The following conditions applied to taking decisions:

- Majority of countries: 50% + one, if proposal made by the Commission; or else at least two-thirds (66.67%), and
- At least 232 votes (1 November 2004–31 December 2006), 255 votes (1 January 2007–30 June 2013), or 260 votes (1 July 2013–31 October 2014), and
- Majority of population: 62%.

The last condition was only checked upon request by a member state.

In the absence of consensus, qualified majority voting was the Council's key way of decision-making. In terms of the statistics before Croatia became a member of the EU (1 July 2013), the pass condition translated into:

1. At least 14 (or 18, if proposal was not made by the Commission) countries,
2. At least 255 of the total 345 voting weights,
3. At least 311 million people represented by the states that vote in favour.

The last requirement was almost always already implied by the condition on the number of voting weights. The rare exceptions to this could occur in certain cases when a proposal was backed by exactly three of the six most populous member states but not including Germany, that is, three of France, UK, Italy, Spain and Poland, and by all or nearly all of the 21 other members.

Note that the Commission could make a proposal in a way that removed the requirement for a qualified majority. For example, the Anti-Dumping Advisory Committee (ADAC) could approve a proposal to impose tariffs based on a simple, unweighted majority, but overturning it would have required a qualified majority because this meant voting against a Commission proposal. This greatly increased the power of small member states in such circumstances.

The declarations of the conference that adopted the Treaty of Nice contained contradictory statements concerning qualified majority voting after the enlargement of the European Union to 25 and 27 members: one declaration specified that the qualifying majority of votes would increase to a maximum of 73.4%, contradicting another declaration which specified a qualifying majority of 258 votes (74.78%) after enlargement to 27 countries. However, the treaties of accession following the Treaty of Nice clarified the required majority.

After the accession of Croatia, on 1 July 2013, at least 260 votes out of a total of 352 by at least 15 member states were required for legislation to be adopted by qualified majority. Croatia had 7 votes (the same as Denmark, Ireland, Lithuania, Slovakia and Finland).

From 1 July 2013, the pass condition translated into:

1. At least 15 (or 18, if proposal was not made by the Commission) countries,
2. At least 260 of the total 352 voting weights,
3. At least 313.6 million people represented by the states that vote in favour.

=== Penrose method (rejected) ===
Poland proposed the Penrose method (also known as the "square root method"), which would narrow the weighting of votes between the largest and smallest countries in terms of population. The Czech Republic supported this method to some extent, but had warned it would not back a Polish veto on this matter. All the other states remained opposed. After previously refusing to discuss the issue, the German government agreed to include it for discussion at the June council. The given percentage is the game theoretical optimal threshold, and is known as the "Jagiellonian Compromise". The Penrose method voting weights allocated to the states are shown in the adjacent table.

According to the proposal, the requirement for an act to pass in the Council was:

- Majority of voting weights: 61.4%.

== Unanimity ==
Certain policy fields remain subject to unanimity in whole or in part, such as:

- membership of the Union (opening of accession negotiations, association, serious violations of the Union's values, etc.);
  - change the status of an overseas country or territory (OCT) to an outermost region (OMR) or vice versa.
- taxation;
- the finances of the Union (own resources, the Multiannual Financial Framework);
- harmonisation in the field of social security and social protection;
- certain provisions in the field of Justice and Home Affairs (the European prosecutor, family law, operational police cooperation, etc.);
- certain provisions in environmental policy, such as land use, town and city planning and policies affecting the energy mix;
- the flexibility clause (352 TFEU) allowing the Union to act to achieve one of its objectives in the absence of a specific legal basis in the treaties;
- the Common Foreign and Security Policy, with the exception of certain clearly defined cases;
- the Common Security and Defence Policy, with the exception of the establishment of Permanent Structured Cooperation;
- citizenship (the granting of new rights to European citizens, anti-discrimination measures);
- certain institutional issues (the electoral system and composition of the Parliament, certain appointments, the composition of the Committee of the Regions and the European Economic and Social Committee, the seats of the institutions, the language regime, the revision of the treaties, including the bridging clauses, etc.).
