= Banzhaf power index =

Political science index

Computer model of the Banzhaf power index from the Wolfram Demonstrations Project

The Banzhaf power index, named after John Banzhaf (originally invented by Lionel Penrose in 1946 and sometimes called Penrose–Banzhaf index; also known as the Banzhaf–Coleman index after James Samuel Coleman), is a power index defined by the probability of changing an outcome of a vote where voting rights are not necessarily equally divided among the voters or shareholders.

To calculate the power of a voter using the Banzhaf index, list all the winning coalitions, then count the critical voters. A critical voter is a voter who, if changing their vote from yes to no, would cause the measure to fail. A voter's power is measured as the fraction of all swing votes that they could cast. There are some algorithms for calculating the power index, e.g., dynamic programming techniques, enumeration methods and Monte Carlo methods.

== Examples ==
=== Voting game ===
==== Simple voting game ====
A simple voting game, taken from Game Theory and Strategy by Philip D. Straffin:

[6; 4, 3, 2, 1]

The numbers in the brackets mean a measure requires 6 votes to pass, and voter A can cast four votes, B three votes, C two, and D one. The winning groups, with underlined swing voters, are as follows:

AB, AC, ABC, ABD, ACD, BCD, ABCD

There are 12 total swing votes, so by the Banzhaf index, power is divided thus:

A = 5/12, B = 3/12, C = 3/12, D = 1/12

==== U.S. Electoral College ====
Consider the United States Electoral College. Each state has different levels of voting power. There are a total of 538 electoral votes. A majority vote is 270 votes. The Banzhaf power index would be a mathematical representation of how likely a single state would be able to swing the vote. A state such as California, which is allocated 55 electoral votes, would be more likely to swing the vote than a state such as Montana, which has 3 electoral votes.

Assume the United States is having a presidential election between a Republican (R) and a Democrat (D). For simplicity, suppose that only three states are participating: California (55 electoral votes), Texas (38 electoral votes), and New York (29 electoral votes).

The possible outcomes of the election are:

California (55)	Texas (38)	New York (29)	R votes	D votes	States that could swing the vote
R	R	R	122	0	none
R	R	D	93	29	California (D would win 84–38), Texas (D would win 67–55)
R	D	R	84	38	California (D would win 93–29), New York (D would win 67–55)
R	D	D	55	67	Texas (R would win 93–29), New York (R would win 84–38)
D	R	R	67	55	Texas (D would win 93–29), New York (D would win 84–38)
D	R	D	38	84	California (R would win 93–29), New York (R would win 67–55)
D	D	R	29	93	California (R would win 84–38), Texas (R would win 67–55)
D	D	D	0	122	none

The Banzhaf power index of a state is the proportion of the possible outcomes in which that state could swing the election. In this example, all three states have the same index: 4/12 or 1/3.

However, if New York is replaced by Georgia, with only 16 electoral votes, the situation changes dramatically.

California (55)	Texas (38)	Georgia (16)	R votes	D votes	States that could swing the vote
R	R	R	109	0	California (D would win 55–54)
R	R	D	93	16	California (D would win 71–38)
R	D	R	71	38	California (D would win 93–16)
R	D	D	55	54	California (D would win 109–0)
D	R	R	54	55	California (R would win 109–0)
D	R	D	38	71	California (R would win 93–16)
D	D	R	16	93	California (R would win 71–38)
D	D	D	0	109	California (R would win 55–54)

In this example, the Banzhaf index gives California 1 and the other states 0, since California alone has more than half the votes.

== History ==
What is known today as the Banzhaf power index was originally introduced by Lionel Penrose in 1946 and went largely forgotten. It was reinvented by John F. Banzhaf III in 1965, but it had to be reinvented once more by James Samuel Coleman in 1971 before it became part of the mainstream literature.

Banzhaf wanted to prove objectively that the Nassau County board's voting system was unfair. As given in Game Theory and Strategy, votes were allocated as follows:

- Hempstead #1: 9
- Hempstead #2: 9
- North Hempstead: 7
- Oyster Bay: 3
- Glen Cove: 1
- Long Beach: 1

This is 30 total votes, and a simple majority of 16 votes was required for a measure to pass. (Note: Banzhaf did not understand how voting in Nassau County actually worked. Initially 24 votes were apportioned to Hempstead, resulting in 36 total votes. Hempstead was then limited to half of the total, or 18, or 9 for each supervisor. The six eliminated votes were not voted, and the majority required to pass a measure remained at 19.)

In Banzhaf's notation, [Hempstead #1, Hempstead #2, North Hempstead, Oyster Bay, Glen Cove, Long Beach] are A-F in [16; 9, 9, 7, 3, 1, 1]

There are 32 winning coalitions, and 48 swing votes:

AB AC BC ABC ABD ABE ABF ACD ACE ACF BCD BCE BCF ABCD ABCE ABCF ABDE ABDF ABEF ACDE ACDF ACEF BCDE BCDF BCEF ABCDE ABCDF ABCEF ABDEF ACDEF BCDEF ABCDEF

The Banzhaf index gives these values:

- Hempstead #1 = 16/48
- Hempstead #2 = 16/48
- North Hempstead = 16/48
- Oyster Bay = 0/48
- Glen Cove = 0/48
- Long Beach = 0/48

Banzhaf argued that a voting arrangement that gives 0% of the power to 16% of the population is unfair. (Note: Many sources claim that Banzhaf sued (and won). In the original Nassau County litigation, Franklin v. Mandeville 57 Misc.2d 1072 (1968), a New York court ruled that voters in Hempstead were denied equal protection equal because while the town had a majority of the population, they did not have a majority of the weighted vote. Weighted voting would be litigated in Nassau County for the next 25 years, until it was eliminated.)

Today, the Banzhaf power index is an accepted way to measure voting power, along with the alternative Shapley–Shubik power index. Both measures have been applied to the analysis of voting in the Council of the European Union.

However, Banzhaf's analysis has been critiqued as treating votes like coin-flips, and an empirical model of voting rather than a random voting model as used by Banzhaf brings different results.

== See also ==
- Game theory
- Shapley–Shubik power index
- Penrose method
- Penrose square root law
