= Olga Bondareva =

Soviet mathematician and economist

- Ольга Николаевна Бондарева
- Born: Olga Nikolaevna Bondareva; April 27, 1937; Leningrad, USSR
- Died: December 9, 1991 (aged 54); Saint Petersburg
- Education: Leningrad State University
- Known for: Bondareva–Shapley theorem
- Scientific career
- Fields: Mathematics, Economics
- Doctoral advisor: Nikolay Nikolaevich Vorobyev

Olga Nikolaevna Bondareva (April 27, 1937 – December 9, 1991) was a distinguished Soviet mathematician and economist. She contributed to the fields of mathematical economics, especially game theory.

Bondareva is best known as one of the two independent discoverers of the Bondareva–Shapley theorem.

== Biography ==
In 1954 she entered the Mathematics and Mechanics Faculty of Leningrad State University, receiving her Candidate of Sciences degree in 1963 under the supervision of Nikolai Vorobyov. She defended her Doctor of Sciences degree in 1984 at the Faculty of Computational Mathematics and Cybernetics, Moscow State University.

From October 1959 to April 1972 she worked as a junior researcher, then associate professor (in operations research), and then a senior researcher at the Mathematics and Mechanics Faculty of Leningrad State University. From June 1972 to July 1984 was a senior researcher at the Economic Faculty of the Leningrad State University, from July 1984 to March 1989 a senior researcher at the Institute of Physics, and from October, 1989 to her death in 1991 a leading researcher of the Mathematics and Mechanics Faculty of Leningrad State University.

She was married to Lev Alexandrovich Gordon, and had two sons: Maxim (b. 1966 ) and Gregory (b. 1974 ). She was killed in a car accident while crossing the street in St. Petersburg.

== Academic career ==
O. N. Bondareva has published more than 70 scientific papers on game theory and mathematics. She was a member of the editorial board of the international journal Games and Economic Behavior. Her work on cooperative game theory has received international recognition.

The most famous result of Bondareva, obtained during her PhD studies, is the necessary and sufficient conditions for the core of a cooperative game with transferable utility to be non-empty. It was published in the collection "Problems of Cybernetics", quite a prestigious publication, but not translated into English, and was not noticed in the West. In 1967, a similar result was published by Lloyd Shapley. Having learned about the publication of Bondareva, Shapley unconditionally recognized its priority, which ensured its universal recognition.

This theorem uses the notion of a balanced coverage, some analog of partition of unity in topology. This is the name of a set of non-negative numbers assigned to each coalition if their summation over all coalitions, including one (any) player, gives one. The Bondareva–Shapley theorem states that the core is non-empty if and only if, for any balanced covering, the sum over all coalitions of the values of the characteristic function with the corresponding weights does not exceed the value of the characteristic function for the complete coalition. With a small number of players, this theorem allows us to practically deal with any game to the end. In addition, it makes it possible to establish that the core is non-empty in some classes of games, regardless of the number of players, for example, in convex games.

Throughout the 1970s and 1980s, Bondareva studied game-theoretic dominance properties expressed in terms of abstract binary relations, essentially following the example of the seminal monograph Neumann and Morgenstern. In particular, she obtained a number of results on the convergence of spaces with a binary relation and on finite approximations. She was also among the first to publish a theorem on the existence of a maximum element for an acyclic binary relation with open lower contours on a compact set, although her note, published in Russian in the proceedings of the conference (in Vilnius), went unnoticed.

In the late 1970s, Bondareva, together with her students T. E. Kulakovskaya and N. I. Naumova, brainstormed the problem of the existence of a von Neumann-Morgenstern solution in cooperative games with transferable utility (the possibility of non-existence was already known by that time ). In particular, they proved the existence of a solution in any four-player game.

== Bibliography ==
- Бондарева О.Н. Некоторые применения методов линейного программирования к теории кооперативных игр // Проблемы кибернетики. Выпуск 10. — М.: Государственное издательство физико-математической литературы, 1963. — p. 119—139.

translated as : Bondareva O. N. Some applications of linear programming to the theory of cooperative games // Selected Russian Papers in Game Theory 1959—1965. — Princeton: Princeton University Press, 1968. p. 79—114.

- Бондарева О. Н. О теоретико-игровых моделях в экономике. — Л.: Издательство Ленинградского университета, 1974. — 38 с. — 6240 экз.
- Бондарева О. Н. Конечные приближения для ядер и решений кооперативных игр Журнал вычислительной математики и математической физики. — 1976. — 16(3)624—633.
- Bondareva O. N. Сходимость пространств с отношением и теоретико-игровые следствия Журнал вычислительной математики и математической физики. — 1978. — 10(1):84—92.
- Bondareva O. N. Замечание к статье «Сходимость пространств с отношением и теоретико-игровые следствия» (письмо в редакцию) Журнал вычислительной математики и математической физики 1980. — 20(4)1078—1079.
- Bondareva O. N, Кулаковская Т. Е., Наумова Н. И. Решение произвольной кооперативной игры четырех лиц // Вестник Ленинградского университета (Математика). — 1979. — 2(7):104—105.
- Bondareva O. N. Развитие теоретико-игровых методов оптимизации в кооперативных играх и их применение к многокритериальным задачам // Современное состояние теории исследования операций. — Moscow: Наука, 1979. — p. 150—162.
- Bondareva O. N Конечные приближения выбора на бесконечном множестве // Известия АН СССР. Серия «Техническая кибернетика». — 1987. 1:18—23.
- Bondareva O. N. Domination, core and solution (A short survey of Russian results). Discussion Paper No. 185. IMW, University of Bielefeld, 1989.
- Bondareva O. N. Revealed fuzzy preferences // Multiperson Decision Making Models Using Fuzzy Sets and Possibility Theory, ed. J. Kacprzyk and M. Fedrizzi. Dordrecht: Kluwer, 1990.
- Bondareva O. N., Driessen T. S. H. "Extensive coverings and exact core bounds" Games and Economic Behavior — 1994. — v.6(2):212—219.

== Sources ==
Гордон Л. А. Дом. — СПб.: Товарищество журнала «Нева», 1992. — 240 с. — 295 экз. — ISBN 5-87516-010-1

- In memoriam Olga Bondareva (1937—1991) Games and Economic Behavior. — 1992. — 4(2):318—324.
- Rosenmüller J. Obituary and Kulakovskaja T. E., Naumova N. I. Olga Nikolajevna Bondareva. 1937—1991 International Journal of Game Theory. — 1992. — Vol. 20(4):309—312.
- Кукушкин Н. С., Меньшикова О. Р., Меньшиков И. С. Ольга Николаевна Бондарева (некролог) // Журнал вычислительной математики и математической физики. — 1992. — 32(6) 989—990. (в pdf-файле есть фотография)
- Wooders M. "Bondareva, Olga (1937—1991)" The New Palgrave Dictionary of Economics. 2nd Edition. Eds. Steven N. Durlauf and Lawrence E. Blume. — Palgrave Macmillan, 2008. эл.версия
