= Minimum-cost spanning tree game =

A minimum-cost spanning-tree game (MCST game) is a kind of a cooperative game. In an MCST game, each player is a node in a complete graph. The graph contains an additional node - the supply node - denoted by s. The goal of the players is that all of them will be connected by a path to s. To this end, they need to construct a spanning tree. Each edge in the graph has a cost, and the players build the minimum cost spanning tree. The question then arises, how to allocate the cost of this MCST among the players?

The solution offered by cooperative game theory is to consider the cost of each potential coalition - each subset of the players. The cost of each coalition S is the minimum cost of a spanning tree connecting only the nodes in S to the supply node s. The value of S is minus the cost of S. Using these definitions, various solution concepts from cooperative game theory can be applied. MCST games were introduced by Bird in 1976.

== Properties ==
- The core of every MCST game is non-empty.
- The nucleolus is the unique point in the intersection of the core and the kernel.
- If the underlying network is a tree, then the nucleolus coincides with the kernel.

== Computation ==
- One solution in the core can be read directly from any minimum cost spanning tree graph associated with the problem.
- There is an algorithm that requires O(n^{2}) elementary operations for computing each additional point in the core.
- In general MCST games, computing the nucleolus is NP-hard; the proof is by reduction from the minimum set cover problem. There is an algorithm that computes the nucleolus in time O(n^{3}|B|), where B is the set of relevant coalitions (in general, |B|=2^{n}, but in some special cases, only a subset of the coalitions are relevant).
- If the underlying network is a tree, then the nucleolus can be computed in O(n^{3}) time, and the Shapley value can be computed in O(n) time. The run-time of computing the nucleolus can be reduced to O(n log n) using efficiently mergeable heaps. In particular cases, the nucleolus can be computed in O(n) time.

== Spanning forest games ==
A minimum-cost spanning-forest game (MCSF game) is a generalization of an MCST game, in which multiple supply-nodes are allowed. In general, the core of an MCSF game may be empty. However, if the underlying network is a tree, the core is always non-empty, and core points can be computed in strongly-polynomial time.
