= Bondareva–Shapley theorem =

The Bondareva–Shapley theorem, in game theory, describes a necessary and sufficient condition for the non-emptiness of the core of a cooperative game in characteristic function form. Specifically, the game's core is non-empty if and only if the game is balanced. The Bondareva–Shapley theorem implies that market games and convex games have non-empty cores. The theorem was formulated independently by Olga Bondareva and Lloyd Shapley in the 1960s.

== Theorem ==
Let the pair $( N, v)$ be a cooperative game in characteristic function form, where $N$ is the set of players and where the value function $v: 2^N \to \mathbb{R}$ is defined on $N$'s power set (the set of all subsets of $N$).

The core of $( N, v )$ is non-empty if and only if for every function $\alpha : 2^N \setminus \{\emptyset\} \to [0,1]$ where

$\forall i \in N : \sum_{S \in 2^N : \; i \in S} \alpha (S) = 1$
the following condition holds:

$$\sum_{S \in 2^N\setminus\{\emptyset\}} \alpha (S) v (S) \leq v (N).$$
