= Diagonal formula =

The diagonal formula can refer to:

- some geometric method see Polygon entry
- The formula developed by Aumann and Shapley to construct a Shapley value for non atomic games with a continuum of players
