= Linear production game =

Linear production game (LP Game) is a N-person game in which the value of a coalition can be obtained by solving a linear programming problem. It is widely used in the context of resource allocation and payoff distribution. Mathematically, there are m types of resources and n products can be produced out of them. Product j requires $a^j_k$ amount of the kth resource. The products can be sold at a given market price $\vec{c}$ while the resources themselves can not. Each of the N players is given a vector $\vec{b^i}=(b^i_1,...,b^i_m)$ of resources. The value of a coalition S is the maximum profit it can achieve with all the resources possessed by its members. It can be obtained by solving a corresponding linear programming problem $P(S)$ as follows.

$v(S)=\max_{x\geq 0} (c_1x_1+...+c_nx_n)$

$s.t. \quad a^1_jx_1+a^2_jx_2+...+a^n_jx_n\leq \sum_{i\in S}b^i_j \quad \forall j=1,2,...,m$

== Core ==
Every LP game v is a totally balanced game. So every subgame of v has a non-empty core. One imputation can be computed by solving the dual problem of $P(N)$. Let $\alpha$ be the optimal dual solution of $P(N)$. The payoff to player i is $x^i=\sum_{k=1}^m\alpha_k b^i_k$. It can be proved by the duality theorems that $\vec{x}$ is in the core of v.

An important interpretation of the imputation $\vec{x}$ is that under the current market, the value of each resource j is exactly $\alpha_j$, although it is not valued in themselves. So the payoff one player i should receive is the total value of the resources he possesses.

However, not all the imputations in the core can be obtained from the optimal dual solutions. There are a lot of discussions on this problem. One of the mostly widely used method is to consider the r-fold replication of the original problem. It can be shown that if an imputation u is in the core of the r-fold replicated game for all r, then u can be obtained from the optimal dual solution.
