= Shortlex order =

In mathematics, and particularly in the theory of formal languages, shortlex is a total ordering for finite sequences of objects that can themselves be totally ordered. In the shortlex ordering, sequences are primarily sorted by cardinality (length) with the shortest sequences first, and sequences of the same length are sorted into lexicographical order. Shortlex ordering is also called radix, length-lexicographic, military, or genealogical ordering.

In the context of strings on a totally ordered alphabet, the shortlex order is identical to the lexicographical order, except that shorter strings precede longer strings. For example, the shortlex order of the set of strings on the English alphabet (in its usual order) is [ε, a, b, c, ..., z, aa, ab, ac, ..., zz, aaa, aab, aac, ..., zzz, ...], where ε denotes the empty string.

The strings in this ordering over a fixed finite alphabet can be placed into one-to-one order-preserving correspondence with the natural numbers, giving the bijective numeration system for representing numbers. The shortlex ordering is also important in the theory of automatic groups.

== See also ==
Level-order: F, B, G, A, D, I, C, E, H.

- Graded lexicographic order
- Level order
