= Self-enforcing agreement =

A self-enforcing agreement is an agreement that is enforced only by the parties to it; no external party can enforce or interfere with the agreement. (In this respect it differs from an enforceable contract.) The agreement will stand so long as the parties believe it is mutually beneficial and it is not breached by any party.

In game theory, games in which cooperative behaviour can only be enforced through self-enforcing agreements are called non-cooperative games, whereas games allowing strategies relying on external enforcement are called cooperative games. Nash equilibrium is the most common kind of self-enforcing agreement.
