= Market game =

In economic theory, a strategic market game, also known as a market game, is a game explaining price formation through game theory, typically implementing a general equilibrium outcome as a Nash equilibrium.

Fundamentally in a strategic market game, markets work in a strategic way that does not (directly) involve price but can indirectly influence it. The key ingredients to modelling strategic market games are the definition of trading posts (or markets), and their price formation mechanisms as a function of the actions of players. A leading example is the Lloyd Shapley and Martin Shubik trading post game.

Shapley-Shubik use a numeraire and trading posts for the exchange of goods. The relative price of each good in terms of the numeraire is determined as the ratio of the amount of the numeraire brought at each post, to the quantity of goods offered for sale at that post. In this way, every agent is allocated goods in proportion to his bids, so that posts always clear. Pradeep Dubey and John Geanakoplos show that such a game can be a strategic foundation of the Walras equilibrium. A key ingredient of such approaches is to have very large numbers of players, such that for each player the action appears to him as a linear constraint that he cannot influence.

An excellent description of price formation in a strategic market game in which for each commodity there is a unique trading post, on which consumers place offers of the commodity and bids of inside money, is provided by James Peck, Karl Shell and Stephen Spear.
