= Airport problem =

Problem in game theory

In mathematics and especially game theory, the airport problem is a type of fair division problem in which it is decided how to distribute the cost of an airport runway among different players who need runways of different lengths. The problem was introduced by S. C. Littlechild and G. Owen in 1973. Their proposed solution is:

1. Divide the cost of providing the minimum level of required facility for the smallest type of aircraft equally among the number of landings of all aircraft
2. Divide the incremental cost of providing the minimum level of required facility for the second smallest type of aircraft (above the cost of the smallest type) equally among the number of landings of all but the smallest type of aircraft. Continue thus until finally the incremental cost of the largest type of aircraft is divided equally among the number of landings made by the largest aircraft type.

The authors note that the resulting set of landing charges is the Shapley value for an appropriately defined game.

== Introduction ==
In an airport problem there is a finite population N and a nonnegative function C: N-R. For technical reasons it is assumed that the population is taken from the set of the natural numbers: players are identified with their 'ranking number'. The cost function satisfies the inequality C(i) <C（j）whenever i <j. It is typical for airport problems that the cost C（i）is assumed to be a part of the cost C(j) if i<j, i.e. a coalition S is confronted with costs c(S): =MAX C(i). In this way an airport problem generates an airport game (N,c). As the value of each one-person coalition (i) equals C(i), we can rediscover the airport problem from the airport game theory.

== Example ==
An airport needs to build a runway for 4 different aircraft types. The building cost associated with each aircraft is 8, 11, 13, 18 for aircraft A, B, C, D. We would come up with the following cost table based on Shapley value:

Aircraft	Adding A	Adding B	Adding C	Adding D	Shapley value
Marginal Cost	8	3	2	5	
Cost to A	2				2
Cost to B	2	1			3
Cost to C	2	1	1		4
Cost to D	2	1	1	5	9
Total					18
