= Pradeep Dubey =

Indian academic (born 1951)

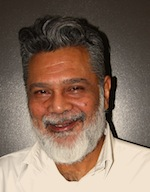
- Born: 9 January 1951 (age 75); Patna, Bihar, India
- Education: Delhi University; Cornell University
- Scientific career
- Fields: Game theory
- Website: sites.google.com/view/pradeepdubey/

Pradeep Dubey (born 9 January 1951) is an Indian game theorist. He is a Professor of Economics at the State University of New York, Stony Brook, and a member of the Stony Brook Center for Game Theory. He also holds a visiting position at Cowles Foundation, Yale University. He did his schooling at the St. Columba's School, Delhi. He received his Ph.D. in applied mathematics from Cornell University and B.Sc. (with honors in physics) from the University of Delhi. His research areas of interest are game theory and mathematical economics. He has published, among others, in Econometrica, Games and Economic Behavior, Journal of Economic Theory, and Quarterly Journal of Economics. He is a Fellow of The Econometric Society, ACM Fellow and a member of the council of the Game Theory Society.

== Academic positions ==
From 1975 until 1978, Dubey was an assistant professor in the School of Organization and Management and Cowles Foundation for Research in Economics at Yale University. In 1978, he became an associate professor at Yale, a position he held until 1984. In 1979, Dubey was a research fellow at the Institute for Advanced Studies at the Hebrew University of Jerusalem. Throughout 1982, he was a senior research fellow at the International Institute for Applied Systems Analysis in Austria. In 1984, Dubey became an economics professor at the University of Illinois Urbana-Champaign and taught there for one year. In the following year, he taught at Stony Brook University in the Department of Applied Mathematics and Statistics and the Institute for Decision Sciences. In 1986, Dubey entered his current position as the leading professor and co-director for the Center for Game Theory in Economics at the university. Additionally, in 2005, he became a visiting professor at the Cowles Foundation for Research in Economics at Yale.

== Selected publications ==
- "On the Uniqueness of the Shapley Value" (1975) International Journal of Game Theory Vol. 4, pp. 131–139.
- "Trade and Prices in a Closed Economy with Exogenous Uncertainty and Different Levels of Information" (1977) (with M. Shubik) Econometrica Vol. 45, pp. 1657–1680.
- "Some Properties of the Banzhaf Power Index" (1979) (with L.S. Shapley) Mathematics of Operations Research Vol. 4, pp. 99–131.
- "Nash Equilibria of Market Games: Finiteness and Inefficiency" (1980) Journal of Economic Theory Vol. 22, pp. 363–376.
- "Price-Quantity Strategic Market Games" (1982) Econometrica Vol. 50, pp. 111–126.
- "Payoffs in Non-atomic Economies: An Axiomatic Approach" (1984) (with A. Neyman) Econometrica Vol. 52, pp. 1129–1150.
- "Noncooperative General Exchange with a Continuum of Traders" (1994) (with L.S. Shapley) Journal of Mathematical Economics Vol. 23, pp. 253–293.
- "Competitive Pooling: Rothschild-Stiglitz Reconsidered" (2002) (with J. Geanakoplos) Quarterly Journal of Economics Vol. 117, pp. 1529–1570.
- "From Nash to Walras via Shapley-Shubik" (2003) (with J. Geanakoplos) Journal of Mathematical Economics Vol. 39, pp. 391–400.
- "Learning with Perfect Information" (2004) (with O. Haimanko) Games and Economic Behavior Vol. 46, pp. 304–324.
- "Default and Punishment in General Equilibrium" (2005) (with J. Geanakoplos & M. Shubik) Econometrica Vol. 73, pp. 1–37.
