= Nikolai Nikolayevich Vorobyov (mathematician) =

20th century Russian mathematician

Nikolai Nikolayevich Vorobyov (also Vorobiev) (Russian: Николай Николаевич Воробьёв, 18 September 1925, Leningrad — July 14, 1995) was a Soviet and Russian mathematician, an expert in the field of abstract algebra, mathematical logic and probability theory, the founder of the Soviet school of game theory. He is an author of two textbooks, three monographs, a large number of mathematical articles and a number of popular science books. He supervised over 30 kandidat and D.Sc (habilitation) dissertations.
