= Lloyd Shapley =

American mathematician (1923–2016)

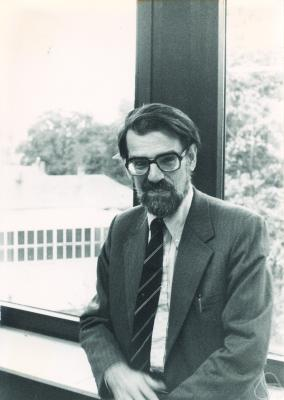
- Shapley in 1980
- Born: Lloyd Stowell Shapley; June 2, 1923; Cambridge, Massachusetts, U.S.
- Died: March 12, 2016 (aged 92); Tucson, Arizona, U.S.
- Education: Harvard University (BA); Princeton University (PhD)
- Known for: Shapley value Shapley–Shubik power index stochastic games Bondareva–Shapley theorem Shapley–Folkman lemma & theorem Gale–Shapley algorithm potential game core, kernel, and nucleolus market games authority distribution multi-person utility non-atomic games
- Spouse: Marian Louise Shapley (since 1955)
- Awards: Nobel Memorial Prize in Economic Sciences (2012); Bronze Star Medal (1944); Golden Goose Award (2013); John von Neumann Theory Prize (1981)
- Scientific career
- Fields: Mathematics, economics
- Workplaces: University of California, Los Angeles; RAND Corporation; Princeton University
- Thesis: Additive and non-additive set functions (1953)
- Doctoral advisor: Albert W. Tucker
- Website: www.econ.ucla.edu/shapley/

Lloyd Stowell Shapley (/ˈʃæpli/; June 2, 1923 – March 12, 2016) was an American mathematician and Nobel Memorial Prize-winning economist. He contributed to the fields of mathematical economics and especially game theory. Shapley is generally considered one of the most important contributors to the development of game theory since the work of von Neumann and Morgenstern. With Alvin E. Roth, Shapley won the 2012 Nobel Memorial Prize in Economic Sciences "for the theory of stable allocations and the practice of market design."

== Life and career ==
Lloyd Shapley was born on June 2, 1923, in Cambridge, Massachusetts, one of the sons of astronomers Harlow Shapley and Martha Betz Shapley, both from Missouri. He attended Phillips Exeter Academy and was a student at Harvard when he was drafted in 1943. He served in the United States Army Air Corps in Chengdu, China and received the Bronze Star decoration for breaking the Soviet weather code.

After the war, Shapley returned to Harvard and graduated with an A.B. in mathematics in 1948. After working for one year at the RAND Corporation, he went to Princeton University where he received a Ph.D. in 1953 based on the thesis "Additive and non-additive set functions". His thesis and post-doctoral work introduced the Shapley value and the core solution in game theory. Shapley defined game theory as "a mathematical study of conflict and cooperation." After graduating, he remained at Princeton for a short time before going back to the RAND corporation from 1954 to 1981. In 1950, while a graduate student, Shapley invented the board game So Long Sucker, along with Mel Hausner, John Forbes Nash, and Martin Shubik. Israeli economist and Nobel Laureate Robert Aumann considered Shapley to be "the greatest game theorist of all time."

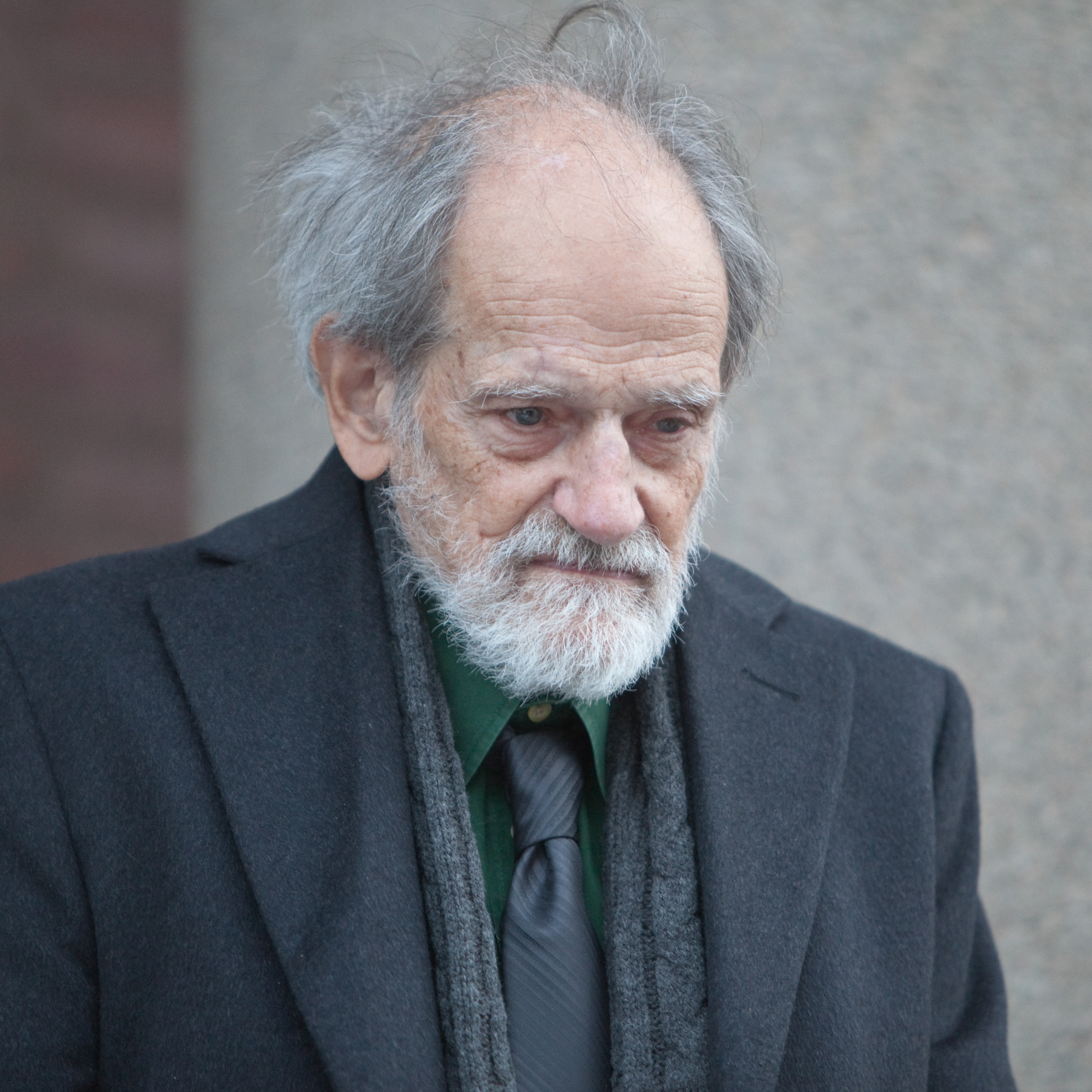
Lloyd Shapley in Stockholm 2012

From 1981 until his death, Shapley was a professor at the University of California, Los Angeles (UCLA), serving at the time of his death as a professor emeritus there, affiliated with the Mathematics and Economics departments. He died on March 12, 2016, in Tucson, Arizona, after suffering from a broken hip, at the age of 92.

Shapley was an expert Kriegspiel player, and an avid baseball fan.

== Contribution ==
Along with the Shapley value, stochastic games, the Bondareva–Shapley theorem (which implies that convex games have non-empty cores), the Shapley–Shubik power index (for weighted or block voting power), the Gale–Shapley algorithm for the stable marriage problem, the concept of a potential game (with Dov Monderer), the Aumann–Shapley pricing, the Harsanyi–Shapley solution, the Snow–Shapley theorem for matrix games, and the Shapley–Folkman lemma & theorem bear his name. According to The Economist, Shapley "may have thought of himself as a mathematician, but he cannot avoid being remembered for his huge contributions to economics". The American Economic Association noted that Shapley was "one of the giants of game theory and economic theory".

Besides, his early work with R. N. Snow and Samuel Karlin on matrix games was so complete that little has been added since. He has been instrumental in the development of utility theory, and it was he who laid much of the groundwork for the solution of the problem of the existence of Von Neumann–Morgenstern stable sets. His work with M. Maschler and B. Peleg on the kernel and the nucleolus, and his work with Robert Aumann on non-atomic games and on long-term competition have all appeared in economic theory.

Shapley argued with his sons about whether he should accept the Nobel Prize at all. He opined that his father, the astronomer Harlow Shapley, deserved it more. His sons persuaded him to accept it and accompanied him to Stockholm.

== Awards and honors ==
- Bronze Star, U.S. Army Air Corps, 1944
- Procter Fellow, Princeton University, 1951–52
- Fellow, Econometric Society, 1967
- Fellow, American Academy of Arts and Sciences, 1974
- Member, National Academy of Sciences, 1978
- John von Neumann Theory Prize, 1981
- Honorary Ph.D., Hebrew University of Jerusalem, 1986
- Fellow, INFORMS (Institute for Operations Research and the Management Sciences), 2002
- Distinguished Fellow, American Economic Association, 2007
- Fellow, American Mathematical Society, 2012
- Sveriges Riksbank Nobel Memorial Prize in Economic Sciences, 2012
- Golden Goose Award, 2013

== Selected publications ==
- A Value for n-person Games [1953], In Contributions to the Theory of Games volume II, H. W. Kuhn and A. W. Tucker (eds.).
- Stochastic Games [1953], Proceedings of National Academy of Science Vol. 39, pp. 1095–1100. doi:10.1073/pnas.39.10.1095
- A Method for Evaluating the Distribution of Power in a Committee System [1954] (with Martin Shubik), American Political Science Review Vol. 48, pp. 787–792.
- College Admissions and the Stability of Marriage [1962] (with David Gale), The American Mathematical Monthly Vol. 69, pp. 9–15.
- Simple Games : An Outline of the Descriptive Theory [1962], Behavioral Science Vol. 7, pp. 59–66.
- On Balanced Sets and Cores [1967], Naval Research Logistics Quarterly Vol. 14, pp. 453–460.
- On Market Games [1969] (with Martin Shubik), Journal of Economic Theory Vol. 1, pp. 9–25.
- Utility Comparison and the Theory of Games [1969], La Decision, pp. 251–263.
- Cores of Convex Games [1971] International Journal of Game Theory Vol. 1, pp. 11–26.
- The Assignment Game I: The Core [1971] (with Martin Shubik), International Journal of Game Theory Vol. 1, pp. 111–130.
- Values of Non-Atomic Games [1974] (with Robert Aumann), Princeton University Press.
- Mathematical Properties of the Banzhaf Power Index [1979] (with Pradeep Dubey), Mathematics of Operations Research Vol. 4, pp. 99–132.
- Long-Term Competition – A Game-Theoretic Analysis [1994] (with Robert Aumann), in Essays in Game Theory: In Honor of Michael Maschler, Nimrod Megiddo (ed.), Springer-Verlag.
- Potential Games [1996] (with Dov Monderer), Games and Economic Behavior Vol. 14, pp. 124–143.
- On Authority Distributions in Organizations [2003] (with Xingwei Hu), Games and Economic Behavior Vol. 45, pp. 132–152, 153–170.
- Multiperson Utility [2008] (with Manel Baucells). Games and Economic Behavior Vol. 62, pp. 329–347.

== See also ==
- Matching theory (economics)

Awards
Preceded by Thomas J. Sargent; Christopher A. Sims	Laureate of the Nobel Memorial Prize in Economics; 2012; Served alongside: Alvin E. Roth	Succeeded by Eugene F. Fama; Lars Peter Hansen; Robert J. Shiller
