= Core (game theory) =

Set in game theory

In cooperative game theory, the core is the set of feasible allocations or imputations where no coalition of agents can benefit by breaking away from the grand coalition. One can think of the core corresponding to situations where it is possible to sustain cooperation among all agents. A coalition is said to improve upon or block a feasible allocation if the members of that coalition can generate more value among themselves than they are allocated in the original allocation. As such, that coalition is not incentivized to stay with the grand coalition.

An allocation is said to be in the core of a game if there is no coalition that can improve upon it. The core is then the set of all feasible allocations.

== Origin ==
The idea of the core already appeared in the writings of Edgeworth (1881), at the time referred to as the contract curve. Even though von Neumann and Morgenstern considered it an interesting concept, they only worked with zero-sum games where the core is always empty. The modern definition of the core is due to Donald B. Gillies and Lloyd Shapley.

== Definition ==
Consider a transferable utility cooperative game $(N,v)$ where $N$ denotes the set of players and $v$ is the characteristic function. An imputation $x\in\mathbb{R}^N$ is dominated by another imputation $y$ if there exists a coalition $C$, such that each player in $C$ weakly-prefers $y$ ($x_i\leq y_i$ for all $i\in C$) and there exists $i\in C$ that strictly-prefers $y$ ($x_i<y_i$), and $C$ can enforce $y$ by threatening to leave the grand coalition to form $C$ ($\sum_{i\in C}y_i\leq v(C)$). The core is the set of imputations that are not dominated by any other imputation.

=== Weak core ===
An imputation $x\in\mathbb{R}^N$ is strongly-dominated by another imputation $y$ if there exists a coalition $C$, such that each player in $C$ strictly-prefers $y$ ($x_i < y_i$ for all $i\in C$). The weak core is the set of imputations that are not strongly-dominated.

== Properties ==
- Another definition, equivalent to the one above, states that the core is a set of payoff allocations $x\in\mathbb{R}^N$ satisfying
1. Efficiency: $\sum_{i\in N}x_i=v(N)$,
2. Coalitional rationality: $\sum_{i\in C}x_i\geq v(C)$ for all subsets (coalitions) $C\subseteq N$.
- The core is always well-defined, but can be empty.
- The core is a set which satisfies a system of weak linear inequalities. Hence the core is closed and convex.
- The Bondareva–Shapley theorem: the core of a game is nonempty if and only if the game is "balanced".
- Every Walrasian equilibrium has the core property, but not vice versa. The Edgeworth conjecture states that, given additional assumptions, the limit of the core as the number of consumers goes to infinity is a set of Walrasian equilibria.
- Let there be n players, where n is odd. A game that proposes to divide one unit of a good among a coalition having at least (n+1)/2 members has an empty core. That is, no stable coalition exists.

== Example ==
=== Example 1: Miners ===
Consider a group of n miners, who have discovered large bars of gold. If two miners can carry one piece of gold, then the payoff of a coalition S is

$$v(S) = \begin{cases} |S|/2, & \text{if }|S|\text{ is even}; \\ (|S|-1)/2, & \text{if }|S|\text{ is odd}. \end{cases}$$

If there are more than two miners and there is an even number of miners, then the core consists of the single payoff where each miner gets 1/2. If there is an odd number of miners, then the core is empty.

=== Example 2: Gloves ===
Mr A and Mr B are knitting gloves. The gloves are one-size-fits-all, and two gloves make a pair that they sell for €5. They have each made three gloves. How to share the proceeds from the sale? The problem can be described by a characteristic function form game with the following characteristic function: Each man has three gloves, that is one pair with a market value of €5. Together, they have 6 gloves or 3 pair, having a market value of €15. Since the singleton coalitions (consisting of a single man) are the only non-trivial coalitions of the game all possible distributions of this sum belong to the core, provided both men get at least €5, the amount they can achieve on their own. For instance (7.5, 7.5) belongs to the core, but so does (5, 10) or (9, 6).

=== Example 3: Shoes ===
Suppose a pair consists of a left and a right shoe, which together are worth €10. Consider a game with 2001 players: 1000 of them have 1 left shoe, 1001 have 1 right shoe. The core of this game is somewhat surprising: it consists of a single imputation that gives €10 to each player having a (scarce) left shoe, and €0 to those owning an (oversupplied) right shoe. No coalition can block this outcome, because no left shoe owner will accept less than €10, and any imputation that pays a positive amount to any right shoe owner must pay less than €10000 in total to the other players, who can get €10000 on their own. Therefore, there is just one imputation in the core.

The core remains the same, even if we increase the numbers as long as left shoes are scarcer. The core has been criticized for being so extremely sensitive to oversupply of one type of player.

== The core in general equilibrium theory ==
The Walrasian equilibria of an exchange economy in a general equilibrium model, will lie in the core of the cooperation game between the agents. Graphically, and in a two-agent economy (see Edgeworth Box), the core is the set of points on the contract curve (the set of Pareto optimal allocations) lying between each of the agents' indifference curves defined at the initial endowments.

== The core in voting theory ==
When alternatives are allocations (list of consumption bundles), it is natural to assume that any nonempty subsets of individuals can block a given allocation. When alternatives are public (such as the amount of a certain public good), however, it is more appropriate to assume that only the coalitions that are large enough can block a given alternative. The collection of such large ("winning") coalitions is called a simple game. The core of a simple game with respect to a profile of preferences is based on the idea that only winning coalitions can reject an alternative $x$ in favor of another alternative $y$. A necessary and sufficient condition for the core to be nonempty for all profile of preferences, is provided in terms of the Nakamura number for the simple game.

== See also ==
- Cooperative bargaining
- Welfare economics
- Pareto efficiency
- Knaster–Kuratowski–Mazurkiewicz–Shapley theorem - instrumental in proving the non-emptiness of the core.
