= List of game theorists =

This is a list of notable biologists, economists, mathematicians, political scientists, and computer scientists whose work has added substantially to the field of game theory.

== A ==
- Derek Abbott – quantum game theory and Parrondo's games
- Susanne Albers – algorithmic game theory and algorithm analysis
- Kenneth Arrow – voting theory (Nobel Memorial Prize in Economic Sciences in 1972)
- Robert Aumann – equilibrium theory (Nobel Memorial Prize in Economic Sciences in 2005)
- Robert Axelrod – repeated Prisoner's Dilemma

== B ==
- Tamer Başar – dynamic game theory and application robust control of systems with uncertainty
- Cristina Bicchieri – epistemology of game theory
- Olga Bondareva – Bondareva–Shapley theorem
- Steven Brams – cake cutting, fair division, theory of moves

== C ==
- Jennifer Tour Chayes – algorithmic game theory and auction algorithms
- John Horton Conway – combinatorial game theory
- Antoine Augustin Cournot – monopoly and oligopoly games

== F ==
- Drew Fudenberg – repeated games and reputation effects

== H ==
- W.D. Hamilton – evolutionary game theory
- John Harsanyi – equilibrium theory (Nobel Memorial Prize in Economic Sciences in 1994)
- Monika Henzinger – algorithmic game theory and information retrieval
- John Hicks – general equilibrium theory (including Kaldor–Hicks efficiency)
- Naira Hovakimyan – differential games and adaptive control
- Peter L. Hurd – evolution of aggressive behavior

== I ==
- Rufus Isaacs – differential games

== K ==
- Ehud Kalai – Kalai–Smorodinsky bargaining solution, rational learning, strategic complexity
- Anna Karlin – algorithmic game theory and online algorithms
- Michael Kearns – algorithmic game theory and computational social science
- Sarit Kraus – non-monotonic reasoning

== M ==
- John Maynard Smith – evolutionary game theory
- Oskar Morgenstern – social organization
- Roger Myerson – mechanism design (Nobel Memorial Prize in Economic Sciences in 2007)

== N ==
- John F Nash – Nash equilibrium (Nobel Memorial Prize in Economic Sciences in 1994)
- John Von Neumann – Minimax theorem, expected utility, social organization, arms race
- Abraham Neyman – Stochastic games, Shapley value

== P ==
- Geoff Parker - evolutionary game theory
- J. M. R. Parrondo – games with a reversal of fortune, such as Parrondo's games
- Charles E. M. Pearce – games applied to queuing theory
- George R. Price – evolutionary game theory
- Anatol Rapoport – Mathematical psychologist, early proponent of tit-for-tat in repeated Prisoner's Dilemma

== R ==
- Julia Robinson – proved that fictitious play dynamics converges to the mixed strategy Nash equilibrium in two-player zero-sum games
- Alvin E. Roth – market design (Nobel Memorial Prize in Economic Sciences 2012)
- Ariel Rubinstein – bargaining theory, learning and language

== S ==
- Thomas Jerome Schaefer – computational complexity of perfect-information games
- Suzanne Scotchmer – patent law incentive models
- Reinhard Selten – bounded rationality (Nobel Memorial Prize in Economic Sciences in 1994)
- Claude Shannon – studied cryptography and chess; sometimes called "the father of information theory"
- Lloyd Shapley – Shapley value and core concept in coalition games (Nobel Memorial Prize in Economic Sciences 2012)
- Eilon Solan – Stochastic games, stopping games
- Thomas Schelling – bargaining (Nobel Memorial Prize in Economic Sciences in 2005) and models of segregation

== T ==
- Éva Tardos – algorithmic game theory
- Hamidou Tembine - Mean-field-type game theory
- Stef Tijs – cooperative game theory (including the Tijs value)

== V ==
- William Vickrey – auction theory

== W ==
- Myrna Wooders – coalition theory
