= Robert Aumann =

Israeli-American mathematician (born 1930)

Robert Aumann ישראל אומן
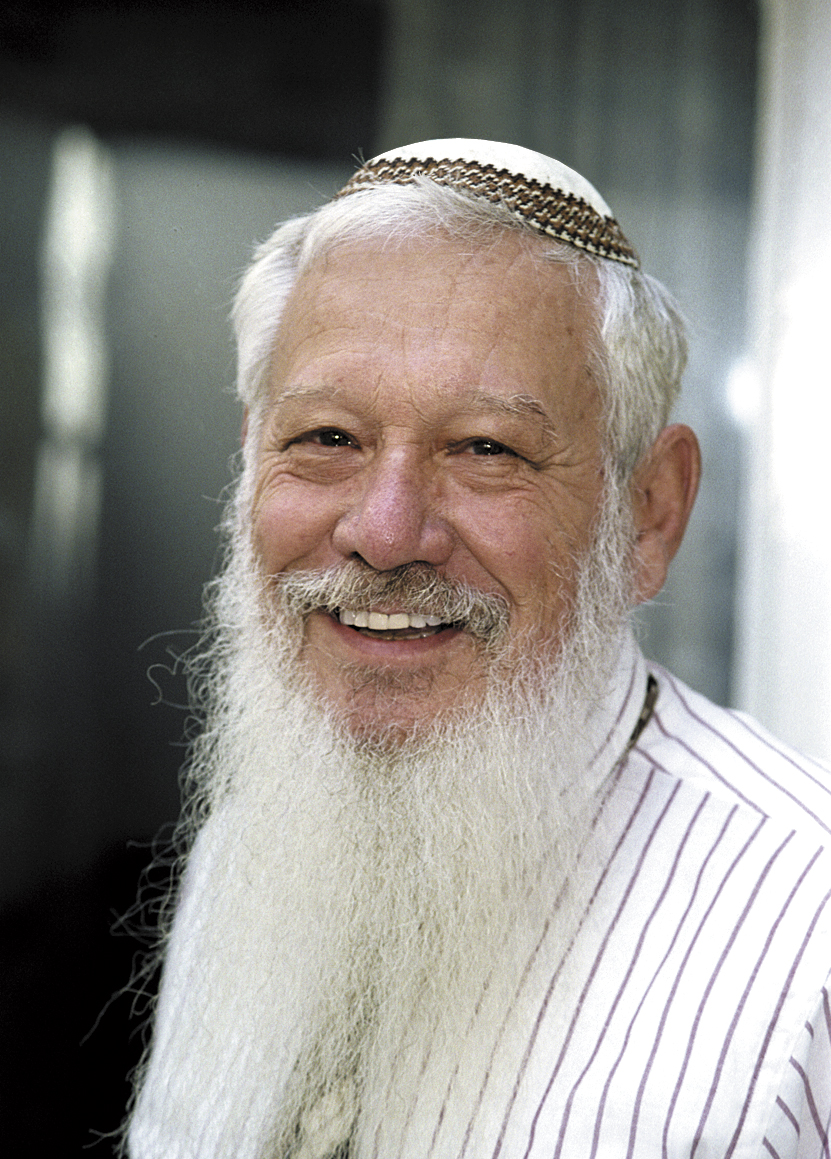
- Aumann in 2005
- Born: Robert John Aumann; 8 June 1930 (age 96); Frankfurt, Prussia, Germany

Academic background
- Education: City College of New York (BS); Massachusetts Institute of Technology (MS, PhD)
- Thesis: Asphericity of alternating linkages (1955)
- Doctoral advisor: George Whitehead, Jr.

Academic work
- Discipline: Mathematical economics Game theory
- Institutions: Hebrew University of Jerusalem; Stony Brook University
- Doctoral students: David Schmeidler; Sergiu Hart; Abraham Neyman; Yair Tauman
- Notable ideas: Aumann's agreement theorem Folk theorem Correlated equilibrium Anscombe-Aumann framework Integral of a correspondence
- Awards: Nobel Memorial Prize in Economics; Erwin Plein Nemmers Prize in Economics; John von Neumann Theory Prize; Harvey Prize in Science and Technology; Israel Prize for Economical Research
- Website: Information at IDEAS / RePEc

Robert John Aumann (Yisrael Aumann, Hebrew: ישראל אומן; born June 8, 1930) is an Israeli-American mathematician, and a member of the United States National Academy of Sciences. He is a professor at the Center for the Study of Rationality in the Hebrew University of Jerusalem. He also holds a visiting position at Stony Brook University, and is one of the founding members of the Stony Brook Center for Game Theory.

Aumann received the Nobel Memorial Prize in Economic Sciences in 2005 for his work on conflict and cooperation through game theory analysis. He shared the prize with Thomas Schelling.

== Early life and education ==
Aumann was born in Frankfurt am Main, Germany, and fled to the United States with his family in 1938, two weeks before the Kristallnacht pogrom. He attended the Rabbi Jacob Joseph School, a yeshiva high school in New York City.

Aumann graduated from the City College of New York in 1950 with a B.S. in mathematics. He received his M.S. in 1952, and his Ph.D. in Mathematics in 1955, both from the Massachusetts Institute of Technology. His doctoral dissertation, Asphericity of Alternating Linkages, concerned knot theory. His advisor was George Whitehead, Jr.

== Academic career ==
In 1956 he joined the Mathematics faculty of the Hebrew University of Jerusalem and has been a visiting professor at Stony Brook University since 1989. He has held visiting professorship at the University of California, Berkeley (1971, 1985–1986), Stanford University (1975–1976, 1980–1981), and Universite Catholique de Louvain (1972, 1978, 1984).

=== Mathematical and scientific contribution ===
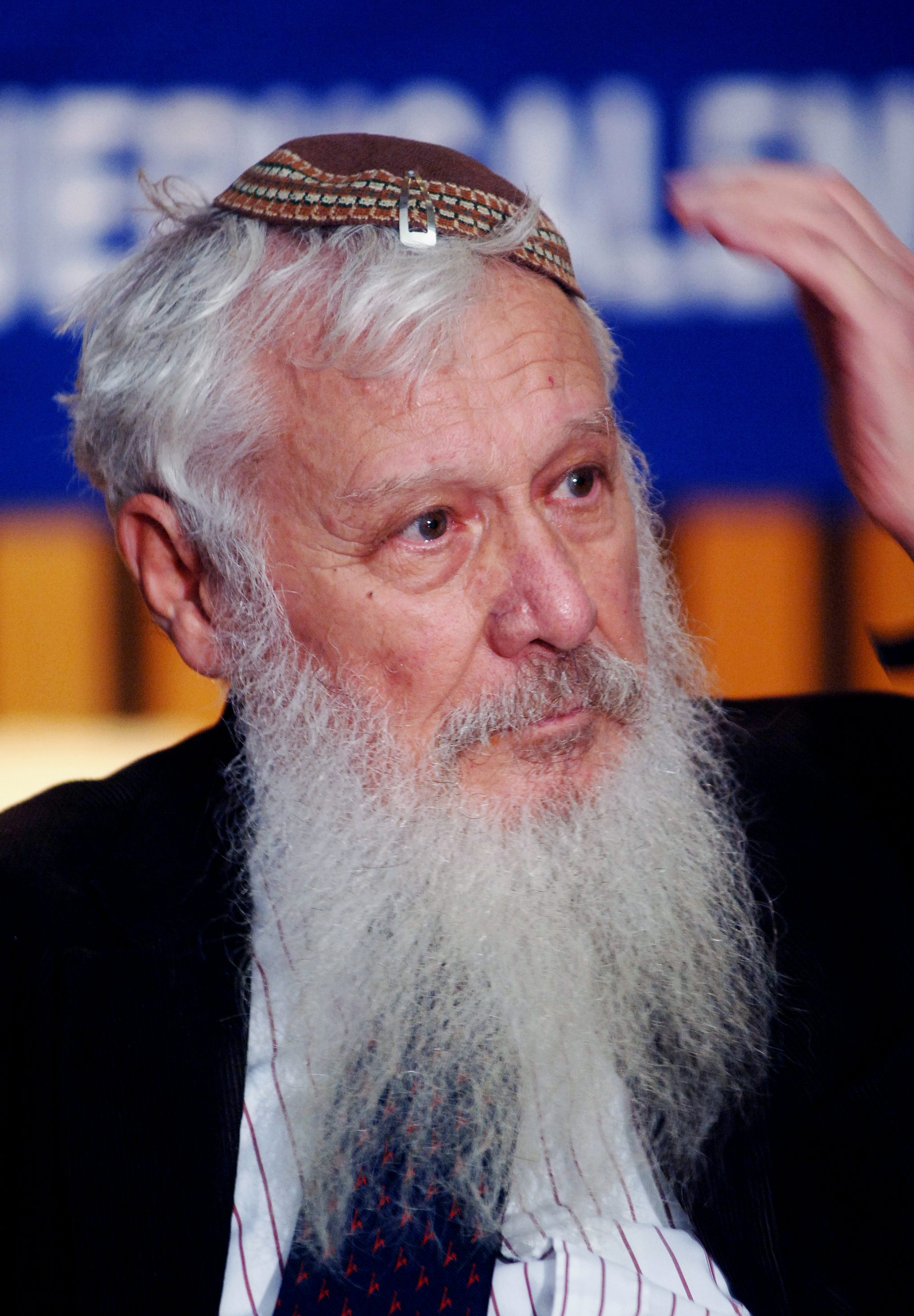
Aumann in 2005

Aumann's greatest contribution was in the realm of repeated games, which are situations in which players encounter the same situation over and over again.

Aumann was the first to define the concept of correlated equilibrium in game theory, which is a type of equilibrium in non-cooperative games that is more flexible than the classical Nash equilibrium. Furthermore, Aumann has introduced the first purely formal account of the notion of common knowledge in game theory. He collaborated with Lloyd Shapley on the Aumann–Shapley value. He is also known for Aumann's agreement theorem, in which he argues that under his given conditions, two Bayesian rationalists with common prior beliefs cannot agree to disagree.

Aumann and Maschler used game theory to analyze Talmudic dilemmas. They were able to solve the mystery about the "division problem", a long-standing dilemma of explaining the Talmudic rationale in dividing the heritage of a late husband to his three wives depending on the worth of the heritage compared to its original worth. The article in that matter was dedicated to a son of Aumann, Shlomo, who was killed during the 1982 Lebanon War, while serving as a tank gunner in the Israel Defense Forces's armored corps.

Aumann's Ph.D. students include David Schmeidler, Sergiu Hart, Abraham Neyman, and Yair Tauman.

=== Torah codes controversy ===
Aumann has entered the controversy of Bible codes research. In his position as both a religious Jew and a man of science, the codes research holds special interest to him. He has partially vouched for the validity of the "Great Rabbis Experiment" by Doron Witztum, Eliyahu Rips, and Yoav Rosenberg, which was published in Statistical Science. Aumann not only arranged for Rips to give a lecture on Torah codes in the Israel Academy of Sciences and Humanities, but sponsored the Witztum-Rips-Rosenberg paper for publication in the Proceedings of the National Academy of Sciences. The academy requires a member to sponsor any publication in its Proceedings; the paper was turned down however.

In 1996, a committee consisting of Robert J. Aumann, Dror Bar-Natan, Hillel Furstenberg, Isaak Lapides, and Rips, was formed to examine the results that had been reported by H.J. Gans regarding the existence of "encoded" text in the Bible foretelling events that took place many years after the Bible was written. The committee performed two additional tests in the spirit of the Gans experiments. Both tests failed to confirm the existence of the putative code.

After a long analysis of the experiment and the dynamics of the controversy, stating for example that "almost everybody included [in the controversy] made up their mind early in the game," Aumann concluded: "A priori, the thesis of the Codes research seems wildly improbable... Research conducted under my own supervision failed to confirm the existence of the codes – though it also did not establish their non-existence. So I must return to my a priori estimate, that the Codes phenomenon is improbable".

== Political views ==
These are some of the themes of Aumann's Nobel lecture, named "War and Peace":

1. War is not irrational, but must be scientifically studied in order to be understood, and eventually conquered;
2. Repeated game study de-emphasizes the "now" for the sake of the "later";
3. Simplistic peacemaking can cause war, while an arms race, credible war threats and mutually assured destruction can reliably prevent war.

Aumann is a member of Professors for a Strong Israel (PSI), a right-wing political group. Aumann opposed the disengagement from Gaza in 2005 claiming that it was a crime against Gush Katif settlers and a serious threat to the security of Israel. Aumann drew on a case in game theory called the Blackmailer Paradox to argue that giving land to the Arabs is strategically foolish based on the mathematical theory. By presenting an unyielding demand, he claims that the Arab states will force Israel to "yield to blackmail due to the perception that it will leave the negotiating room with nothing if it is inflexible".

As a result of his political views, and his use of his research to justify them, the decision to give him the Nobel prize was criticized in the European press. A petition to cancel his prize garnered signatures from 1,000 academics worldwide.

In a speech to the religious Zionist youth movement, Bnei Akiva, Aumann argued that Israel is in "deep trouble" due to his belief that anti-Zionist Satmar Jews might have been right in their condemnation of the original Zionist movement. "I fear the Satmars were right", he said, and quoted a verse from Psalm 127: "Unless the Lord builds a house, its builders toil on it in vain." Aumann feels that the historical Zionist establishment failed to transmit its message to its successors, because it was secular. The only way that Zionism can survive, according to Aumann, is if it has a religious basis.

In 2008, Aumann joined the right-wing religious Zionist Ahi political party, which was led at the time by Effi Eitam and Yitzhak Levy.

== Personal life ==
Aumann married Esther Schlesinger in April 1955 in Brooklyn. They had met in 1953, when Esther, who was from Israel, was visiting the United States. The couple had five children; the oldest, Shlomo, a student in Yeshivat Shaalvim, was killed in action while serving as a tank gunner in the Israel Defense Forces's armored corps in the 1982 Lebanon War. Machon Shlomo Aumann, an institute affiliated with Shaalvim that republishes old manuscripts of Jewish legal texts, was named after him. Esther died of ovarian cancer in October 1998. In late November 2005, Aumann married Esther's widowed sister, Batya Cohn.

Aumann is a cousin of the late Oliver Sacks.

== Honours and awards ==
- 1974: Foreign Honorary Member of the American Academy of Arts and Sciences
- 1983: Harvey Prize in Science and Technology.
- 1994: Israel Prize for economics.
- 1998: Erwin Plein Nemmers Prize in Economics from Northwestern University.
- 2002: The EMET Prize in the Social Sciences category, for Economics
- 2005: Nobel Memorial Prize in Economic Sciences (share US$1.3 million prize with Thomas Schelling).
- 2006: Yakir Yerushalayim (Worthy Citizen of Jerusalem) award from the city of Jerusalem.

== Publications ==
- 1956: Asphericity of alternating knots, Annals of Mathematics 64: 374–92 doi:10.2307/1969980
- 1958: (with Joseph Kruskal) The Coefficients in an Allocation Problem, Naval Research Logistics
- 1960: Acceptable Points in Games of Perfect Information, Pacific Journal of Mathematics 10 (1960), pp. 381–417
- 1974: (with L.S. Shapley) Values of Non-Atomic Games, Princeton University Press
- 1981: (with Y. Tauman and S. Zamir) Game Theory, volumes 1 & 2 (in Hebrew), Everyman's University, Tel Aviv
- 1989: Lectures on Game Theory, Underground Classics in Economics, Westview Press
- 1992, 1994, 2002: (coedited with Sergiu Hart) Handbook of Game Theory with Economic Applications, volumes 1,2 & 3 Elsevier
- 1995: (with M. Maschler) Repeated Games with Incomplete Information, MIT Press
- 2000: Collected Papers, volumes 1 & 2, MIT Press.
- 2015: (with I. Arieli) The Logic of Backward Induction, Journal of Economic Theory 159 (2015), pp. 443–464

== See also ==
- List of Israel Prize recipients
- List of Israeli Nobel laureates
- List of Jewish Nobel laureates
- List of economists

Awards
Preceded by Finn E. Kydland; Edward C. Prescott	Laureate of the Nobel Memorial Prize in Economics; 2005; Served alongside: Thomas C. Schelling	Succeeded by Edmund S. Phelps
