= Daniel-Yitzhak Levy =

Israeli politician

- דניאל יצחק לוי
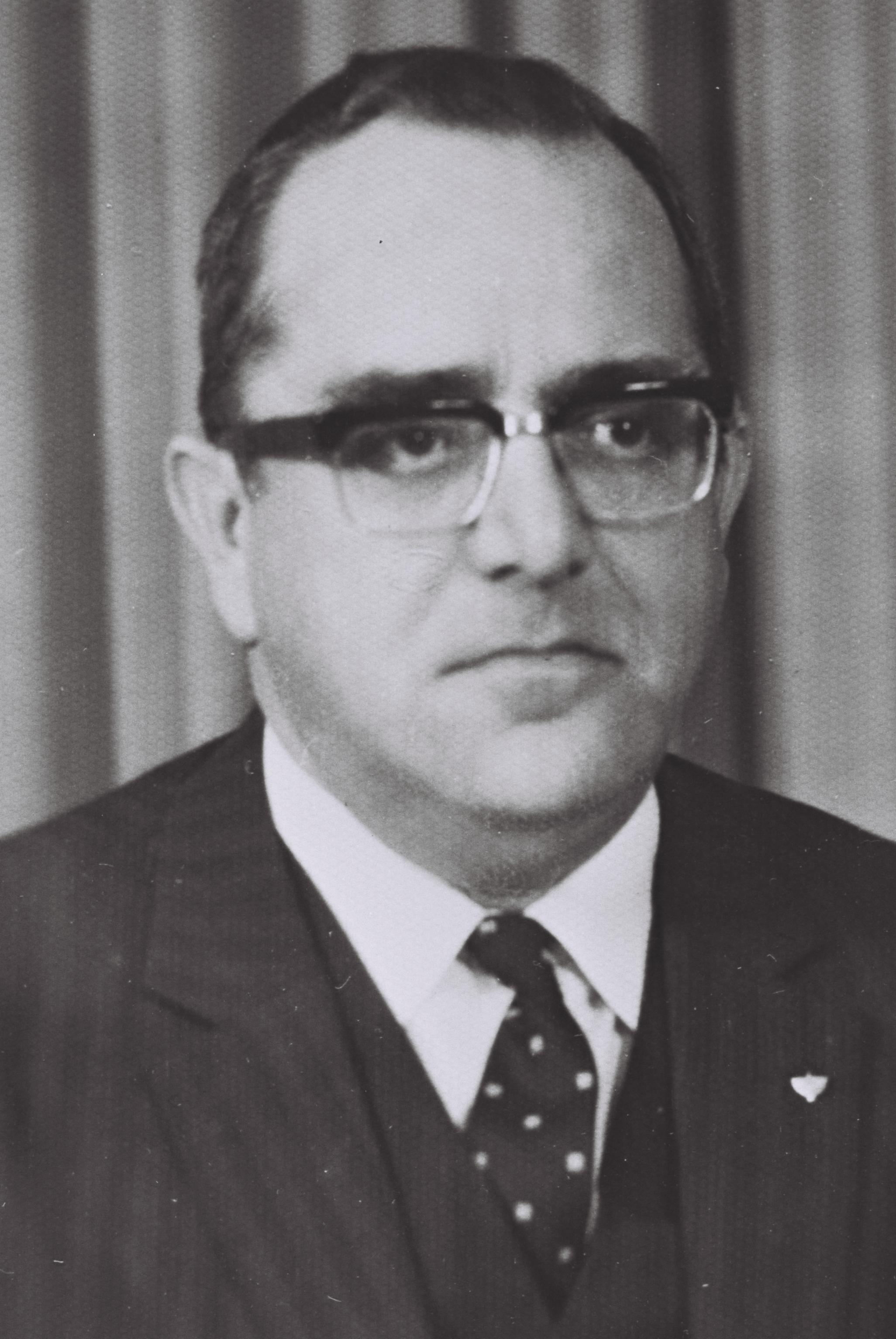

Faction represented in the Knesset
- 1965–1974: National Religious Party

Personal details
- Born: 30 September 1917; Ceuta, Spanish Morocco
- Died: 13 February 1995 (aged 77)

Daniel-Yitzhak Levy (Hebrew: דניאל יצחק לוי; born 30 September 1917, died 13 February 1995) was an Israeli politician who served as a member of the Knesset for the National Religious Party between 1965 and 1974.

== Biography ==
Born in Ceuta, Levy studied psychology and pedagogy. He was a member of the national committee of the Zionist Federation of Morocco. He was involved in illegal Jewish immigration to Mandatory Palestine, before making aliyah himself in 1957. In Israel he worked for Bank Mizrahi, becoming deputy manager of the Ramla branch. He was also involved in religious education.

Levy was elected head of the Ashkelon branch of Hapoel HaMizrachi, which later formed the National Religious Party (NRP), of which he became a member of the central committee. He was elected to the Knesset on the NRP list in 1965, and was re-elected in 1969, before losing his seat in the 1973 elections. His son Yitzhak also represented the NRP and Ahi in the Knesset between 1992 and 2009.

He died in 1995 at the age of 77.
