= Solan (disambiguation) =

Solan is a town in northern India.

Solan may also refer to:

- Places:
  - Solan district, a district in northern India
  - Solan (Vidhan Sabha constituency)
  - Solan railway station
- People:
  - Solan (Xena: Warrior Princess), fictional character
  - Eilon Solan, Israeli mathematician and writer
  - Ken Solan, English footballer
  - Solan Mirisim (1978–2025), Papua New Guinean politician and Minister of the Papua New Guinea Defence Force
  - Lawrence Solan (1952–2024), American Professor of Law at Brooklyn Law School
  - Peter Solan (director), Slovak film director
  - Peter Solan (Gaelic footballer)
  - Ramzi Solan, Saudi Arabian footballer

== See also ==
- Solans, a surname
- Sohlan
- Solan goose
