= Itamar Eitam =

- איתמר איתם

Faction represented in the Knesset
- 2026–: Religious Zionist Party

Personal details
- Born: 18 March 1981 (age 45) Nov, Golan Heights, Israel
- Parent: Effi Eitam (father)
- Occupation: Educator, social activist, military officer

Itamar Mordechai Eitam (Hebrew: איתמר מרדכי איתם) is an Israeli reserve lieutenant colonel, educator, and social activist. He is a co-founder of the Reservists – Generation of Victory movement.

In September 2026, Bezalel Smotrich, leader of the Religious Zionist Party and Israel's minister of finance, announced that Eitam would join the party's electoral list ahead of the 2026 Israeli legislative election.

== Biography ==
=== Early life and military career ===
Itamar Eitam was born and raised in Nov, a moshav in the Golan Heights. He is the second son of Effi Eitam, a retired brigadier general, former government minister, and former leader of the National Religious Party, and his wife Ilit, a parenting instructor. He has seven siblings, including Amitsur, a judge of the Israeli labor court system; Amana, the wife of Brigadier General Yair Zuckerman; and Avichai, the rabbi of Kfar Pines.

Eitam attended the Hispin Yeshiva High School and the Bnei David pre-military academy. He enlisted in the Israel Defense Forces (IDF) in 2001 and served in the Egoz Unit, then part of the Golani Brigade, where he commanded a company.

While serving as a commander in the brigade's 51st Battalion, he participated in the Battle of Bint Jbeil during the Second Lebanon War, in which deputy battalion commander Roi Klein was killed.

His final position in active military service was as special operations officer in the Gaza Division, during Operation Pillar of Defense and Operation Protective Edge. As a reservist, he commanded a battalion in the Alexandroni Brigade.

During the Gaza war, Eitam commanded the 6828th Reconnaissance Battalion of the Bislamach Brigade in combat operations in the Gaza Strip and Lebanon. He also served as an instructor in a company commanders' course.

In May 2024, during the Second Battle of Jabalia, Eitam was moderately wounded in the back by a Hamas sniper. Following a period of medical treatment and rehabilitation, he returned to command his battalion.

=== Education and professional career ===
Eitam holds a bachelor's degree in political science and government from the University of Haifa, and master's degrees in military and security studies and Talmud from Bar-Ilan University. He is also a graduate of the social leadership program at the Mandel Leadership Institute.

He worked as an educator at the Hodayot youth village, where he also coordinated social education programs. In parallel, he supervised community-based social education within the Israeli Ministry of Education.

=== Social and political activities ===
Eitam co-founded the Nikra'im LaDegel ("Called to the Flag") movement alongside retired Brigadier General Danny Van Biran and political scientist Asher Cohen. The movement was established amid the social and political divisions surrounding the 2023 Israeli judicial reform, particularly in opposition to the refusal of military service as a form of protest.

According to Eitam, one of the movement's goals is to restore the ability of Israelis to communicate with one another despite their differences. The movement also promotes Jewish values, national security, and Zionism.

Eitam is also a co-founder of the Reservists – Generation of Victory movement, and serves on its executive board. He is also involved in the War Wounded Forum, which advocates military victory and the decisive defeat of Israel's enemies.

Eitam was a panelist on the television program Moria and Berko, broadcast on Reshet 13. He stated that his participation was intended to engage with audiences outside his usual political and social circles.

In September 2026, Bezalel Smotrich announced that Eitam would join the Religious Zionist Party's candidate list for the 2026 Israeli legislative election.

=== Personal life ===
Eitam is married to Naama, a biology coordinator at the Bnei Akiva Tikvat Yaakov Yeshiva High School. They have six children and live in Hoshaya.
