= Bob Shop =

South African online auction website

- Company type: Private company
- Founded: 1999
- Headquarters: Johannesburg, South Africa
- Key people: Andy Higgins, Managing Director; Craig Lubbe, Head of Marketplace
- Industry: Online Shopping marketplace
- Products: Online auction hosting
- Parent: Bob Group
- Website: www.bobshop.co.za
- Launched: 1999

Bob Shop, formerly Bidorbuy or bidorbuy.co.za (officially written as one word, all-lowercase; variations: bid or buy, Bidorbuy and Bid or Buy), is a South African e-commerce website based on an internet auction and online marketplace. Transactions on Bidorbuy are in South African Rand.

== History ==
Bidorbuy (Bob Shop) was launched by Andy Higgins in August 1999 at the height of the dotcom boom, in South Africa. Initial funding and support was provided by Professor Yair Tauman, Professor Abraham Neyman, Mr. Danny Barnea, and Mr. Zohar Gilon. In 2000, the platform expanded to India and Australia. In 2001, after the dotcom crash, the Australian site was closed and the Indian website was merged with Baazee.com (which was sold to eBay in 2004).

Bidorbuy.co.za became the largest online marketplace in South Africa and Africa. In 2010, it invested into PayFast, a local online payment company, and 2014 into the e-commerce company uAfrica.com. It merged with UAfrica, in August 2022 to form Bob Group. In March 2023, UAfrica was rebranded as Bob Go and Bidorbuy as Bob Shop.

== Concept ==
Bob Shop's business model is described to be similar to eBay. Listings on the platform are either live auction or listed at a fixed price.

== Charity fund raising ==
Bidorbuy allowed registered charities and non-profit organizations to raise funds on the site. In 2009, charities raised over R425,000 through sales on this platform. The biggest amount, R300,100 was raised for the Ubuntu Education Fund through the sale of the last VW Citi Golf ever made for the general public by the seller Volkswagen South Africa. In the same year, the Celebrities for Charities Auctions event was held on the site, in which 39 celebrities, most notably the archbishop Desmond Tutu, auctioned their time to raise funds for charities. In 2011, several South African celebrities participated in the Celebrity for Charity auctions benefiting charities including Reach for a Dream and Johannesburg Child Welfare.

In March 2016, the Vodacom Blue Bulls rugby team auctioned jerseys signed by the players on Bidorbuy. Samsung South Africa's The #SamsungHeroes online event, was organized on Bidorbuy in July 2016.

== Entrepreneurship advancement activities ==
Bidorbuy and institutions of higher learning collaborated to encourage entrepreneurship among young South Africans. It is claimed that around 60 students of the University of Johannesburg, and Raymond Ackerman Academy of Entrepreneurial Development participated in January 2010 and around 50 students of the Investment Society at the University of Cape Town (InvestSoc) participated in March 2010.

According to Biztech Africa, Bidorbuy claims 20% of the people selling on its site make a living though the use of the platform.

== Notable and controversial listings ==
- Plastic surgery procedures auctioned on Bidorbuy (July 2000).
- The R5 circulation Mandela coins controversy (July 2008)
- Unreleased stamps marking the tenure of the President of South Africa President Kgalema Motlanthe (March 2009)
- A voter tried to auction his vote on Bidorbuy (April 2009)
- Rare ZAR Veldpond coin sold for R450,000 (July 2010)
- An attempt to sell rough diamonds on Bidorbuy (August 2010)
- A dress worn by DA leader Helen Zille auctioned on Bidorbuy for charity (March 2010)
- An attempt to auction toilet paper with the image of ANCYL leader Julius Malema (November 2010)
- First Afrikaans vampire film memorabilia auctioned on Bidorbuy (June 2011)
- ANC centenary gold coins listed for sale on Bidorbuy (October 2011)
- Simultaneous chess game with Garry Kasparov auctioned on Bidorbuy (October 2011)
- Vest worn by Justin Bieber auctioned on Bidorbuy (June 2013)
- Edible chocolate painting auctioned on Bidorbuy (April 2014).
- SAHA auctions Shifty Records memorabilia on Bidorbuy (September 2014).
- Dress made out of loom bands auctioned on Bidorbuy (December 2014).
- A Half-a-Million Coin: Bidorbuy (April 2015).
- Rare coin set to break record in online auction (February 2017).
- Demand for water related items spikes on Bidorbuy as #DayZero draws closer (February 2018).
- FIFA World Cup sparks interest in soccer memorabilia (June 2018).

== Awards ==
- Public's Favorite E-Commerce Website and Best E-Commerce Services Website in the 2011 Jump Shopping South African E-Commerce Awards.
- The winner in the Enterprise category of the 2011 Clickatell Personalized Priority Messaging (PPM)Awards
- Best eCommerce Services Website in the 2012 South African E-Commerce Awards.
- Best Customer Service Website in the 2013 South African E-Commerce Awards.
- Best App for Africa on Africacom 2013 - the Bidorbuy Android app.
- Nominee in the MTN business app of the year 2014 - the Bidorbuy Android app.
- Finalist in the App Circus 2014 - the Bidorbuy Android app.
- Best eCommerce Services Platform in the 2014 South African E-Commerce Awards.
- Best eCommerce Services Platform in the 2015 South African E-Commerce Awards.
- Best Online Market Platform in 2016 South African E-Commerce Awards.
- Best Online Market Platform in 2017 South African E-Commerce Awards.
