= Yair Tauman =

American economist

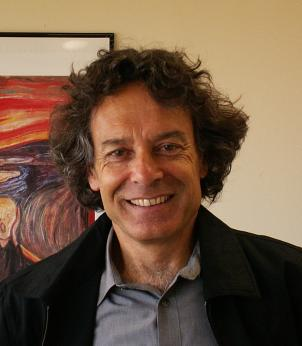
Yair Tauman

Yair Tauman (Hebrew: יאיר טאומן; born January 20, 1948) is a professor of Economics at State University of New York, Stony Brook and the Director of the Stony Brook Center for Game Theory.

== Education and career ==
He studied at the Hebrew University of Jerusalem where he obtained his B.Sc. in Mathematics and Statistics and M.Sc. and Ph.D. in mathematics, the latter two under the supervision of Robert Aumann. His areas of research interests are game theory and industrial organization. He has published, among others, in Econometrica, Games and Economic Behavior, Journal of Economic Theory, Quarterly Journal of Economics and RAND Journal of Economics.

Tauman has been the organizer of the International Summer Conferences in Game Theory for over 30 years, and has been on the faculty at the Kellogg Graduate School of Management and served as the dean of the business school at the Interdisciplinary Center in Hertzliya, Israel. Since 2009 he has served as the academic director of the Zell entrepreneurship program in the Interdisciplinary Center in Hertzliya.

== Other activities ==
=== Business ===
In 2005, Tauman led a small group of Israeli investors to interfere with a takeover of online auction company QXL which was then sold for $1.9 billion. Tauman was also cofounder of Bidorbuy.com and has served as a member of the board of directors for ADFVN Digi-block, Radware, and Expo-bee. Since 2011, Tauman has served as a director at Bank Hapoalim.

=== Film ===
Tauman produced a film about his sister, entitled, My Sister Tikva: A Holocaust Journey. It was named best international film at the Chagrin Documentary Film Festival. Tauman also stars in a TEDx talk on game theory.

== Personal life ==
Tauman is the father of cryptographer Yael Tauman Kalai.

== Selected publications ==
- "The Existence of Non-Diagonal Axiomatic Values" (1976) (with A. Neyman) Mathematics of Operations Research Vol. 1, pp. 246–250.
- "A Non-Diagonal Value on a Reproducing Space" (1977) Mathematics of Operations Research Vol. 2, pp. 331–337.
- "Values on a Class of Non-Differentiable Market Games" (1981) International Journal of Game Theory Vol. 10, pp. 155–162.
- "The Continuity of the Aumann-Shapley Price Mechanism" (1982) (with L. Mirman) Journal of Mathematical Economics Vol. 9, pp. 235–249.
- "The Determination of the Marginal Cost Prices under a Set of Axioms" (1982) (with D. Samet) Econometrica Vol. 50, pp. 895–909.
- "Supportability, Sustainability and Subsidy Free Prices" (1985) (with L. Mirman & I. Zang) RAND Journal of Economics Vol. 16, pp. 114–126.
- "Fees Versus Royalties and the Private Value of a Patent" (1986) (with M. Kamien) Quarterly Journal of Economics Vol. 101, pp. 471–491.
- "Incentive-Compatible Cost-Allocation Schemes" (1994) (with D. Schmeidler) Journal of Economic Theory Vol. 63, pp. 189–207.
- "A Model of Multiple Product Price Competition" (1997) (with A. Urbano & J. Watanabe) Journal of Economic Theory Vol. 77, pp. 377–401.
- "The Shapley Value of a Patent Licensing Game: The Asymptotic Equivalence to Non-cooperative Results" (2007) (with N. Watanabe) Economic Theory Vol. 31, pp. 135–149.
- "General Licensing Schemes for a Cost-Reducing Innovation" (2007) (with D. Sen) Games and Economic Behavior, Vol. 59, pp. 163–186.

== External References ==
- Webpage from Stony Brook University
- TEDx Talk By Yair Tauman
- "Yair Tauman". EconPapers.
- "Yair Tauman". JSTOR.
- Yair Tauman publications indexed by Google Scholar
