= Eilon Solan =

Israeli mathematician

- אילון סולן
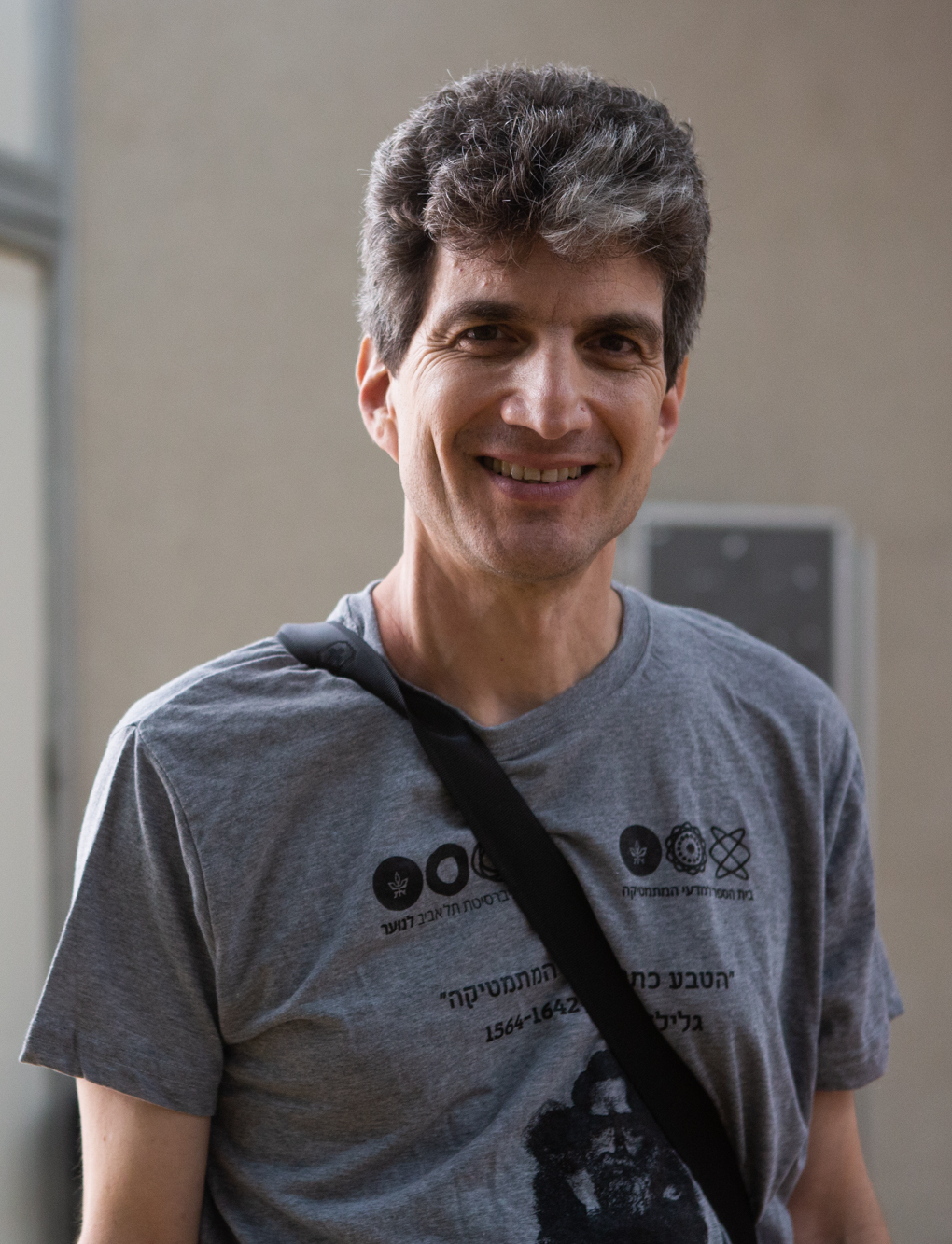
- Born: 1968 (age 57–58)
- Education: Tel Aviv University; Hebrew University of Jerusalem
- Scientific career
- Fields: Game theory
- Workplaces: Tel Aviv University
- Thesis: Stochastic Games (1998)
- Doctoral advisor: Abraham Neyman

Eilon Solan (Hebrew: אילון סולן; born 1968) is an Israeli mathematician and a Professor in the School of Mathematical Sciences at Tel Aviv University. He holds the Dr. Irene Halmos Chair of Game Theory at Tel Aviv University. His research focuses on game theory, stochastic games, and stochastic processes.

== Biography ==
Solan obtained a B.Sc. in mathematics and computer science (summa cum laude) from the Hebrew University of Jerusalem in 1989, and an M.Sc. in mathematics (summa cum laude) from Tel Aviv University in 1993, where his thesis on Discounted Stochastic Games was supervised by Ehud Lehrer.

He completed his doctorate (summa cum laude) at the Hebrew University of Jerusalem in 1998 under the supervision of Abraham Neyman, with a dissertation on stochastic games, for which he was awarded the Kennedy–Leigh Award for an outstanding Ph.D. dissertation.

== Academic Career ==
After his doctorate, Solan joined the Kellogg School of Management at Northwestern University. He joined Tel Aviv University in 2000, where he has remained since.

He is a Fellow of the Game Theory Society (elected 2019) and serves as an Associate Editor for the International Journal of Game Theory (2008–present), Games and Economic Behavior (2013–present), and Mathematics of Operations Research (2003–2018, 2026–present).

== Research ==
Solan's research is focused on dynamic games, particularly stochastic games and stopping games. His work draws on tools from probability theory, mathematical analysis, topology, set theory, and combinatorics, and has at times required the development of new mathematical tools within these fields.

== Stochastic games and equilibria ==
A central open problem in game theory is whether every stochastic game with finite sets of players, states, and actions admits an undiscounted ε-equilibrium for every ε > 0. Jean-Francois Mertens and Abraham Neyman (1981) answered this positively for two-player zero-sum games, and Nicolas Vieille (2000) extended the result to two-player nonzero-sum games. Solan has made significant progress on the multiplayer case:

- Three-player absorbing games: Solan positively resolved the problem for three-player absorbing games (stochastic games with a single non-absorbing state), by extending the vanishing discount factor approach of Vrieze and Thuijsman (1989).

- Extensive-form correlated equilibrium: With Nicolas Vieille, Solan demonstrated that all multiplayer stochastic games admit an extensive-form correlated ε-equilibrium, by extending the Mertens–Neyman method to multiplayer settings.

- Quitting games: Solan and Vieille introduced the class of quitting games, in which each player chooses at every stage to either continue or quit, and play terminates when at least one player quits. They positively resolved the ε-equilibrium existence problem for this class under conditions on terminal payoffs.

- General quitting games: With his sons Omri and Ron Solan, he established the existence of ε-equilibria in general quitting games where at least two players have at least two continue actions, using Brouwer's theorem on the set of zeroes of a continuous functions and the martingale central limit theorem.

== Stopping games ==
Solan has contributed extensively to the theory of stopping games—dynamic games in which each player chooses when to stop the interaction and the payoff depends on who stops and when. With Eran Shmaya, he proved the existence of ε-equilibria in two-player discrete-time stopping games using a novel stochastic variation of Ramsey's theorem on infinite graphs. With Rida Laraki, he proved the existence of ε-equilibria in two-player zero-sum and nonzero-sum stopping games in continuous time. Together with Laraki and Nicolas Vieille, he also provided a counterexample showing that three-player continuous-time stopping games may fail to admit an ε-equilibrium for sufficiently small ε.

== Blackwell games ==
Blackwell games are simultaneous-move infinite-horizon games where each player's payoff is a bounded, Borel measurable function of the entire play path. With Galit Ashkenazi-Golan, János Flesch, and Arkadi Predtetchinski, Solan proved the existence of ε-equilibria in multiplayer Blackwell games with tail-measurable payoff functions, and later characterized the set of equilibrium payoffs in such games via a folk theorem. Techniques developed in this work were also used to establish the existence of an ε-equilibrium in two-player stochastic games with shift-invariant payoffs.

== Identifying the deviator ==
Motivated by Blackwell games, Solan and collaborators (including Noga Alon) studied the problem of identifying which player in a group deviated from a prescribed strategy profile when the group fails to achieve a target outcome. This question is fundamental to equilibrium construction in dynamic games with general payoff functions where equilibrium strategies may lack periodic structure.

== Applications in economics ==
In collaboration with economists, Solan has applied game-theoretic techniques to problems in theoretical economics, including:

- Dynamic inspection: With Chang Zhao, he characterized optimal inspection strategies in dynamic games with multiple inspectees under resource constraints, and studied the informational value of publicly disclosing past inspection outcomes.

- Sender-receiver models: With Jérôme Renault and Nicolas Vieille, he characterized limiting equilibrium payoffs in dynamic information provision models as players become arbitrarily patient.

- Opportunity hunting: With Ran Eilat and Zvika Neeman, he studied a continuous-time stochastic game combining competition and free-riding, proving equilibrium uniqueness via the theory of distributions.

== Mathematical contributions ==
Beyond game theory, Solan has contributed new tools to several areas of mathematics:

- Stochastic Ramsey theorem: A stochastic generalization of Ramsey's theorem on infinite graphs, applicable to stopping games and later extended by Zibo Xu (2011).

- Extensions of Luitzen Egbertus Jan "Bertus" Brouwer's theorem: With Omri Solan, he extended Brouwer's theorem to the case where the parameter space is any connected compact Hausdorff space, and provided a simplified proof of the original theorem.

- Markov chain mixing: With Nicolas Vieille, he developed graph-theoretic techniques for estimating the sensitivity of the stationary distribution of Markov chains to perturbations of the transition matrix.

== CAPTCHA ==
Solan was one of the inventors of CAPTCHA in 1997, along with Eran Reshef and Gili Raanan.

== Books ==
- Borel Games. Chapman & Hall / CRC Press, 2025. 227 pages.

- A Course in Stochastic Game Theory. Cambridge University Press, 2022.

- (with Shmuel Zamir and Michael Maschler) Game Theory. Cambridge University Press, 2013 (1st ed.), 2020 (2nd ed., 1050 pages).

Also published in Chinese (Truth & Wisdom Press, 2017) and Hebrew (Open University Press, 2015; Magness Press, 2008).

== Service and outreach ==
Solan has been active in mathematical outreach and education in Israel:

- Good to Know project (2016–2025): Founder and Director of a project at Tel Aviv University that publishes booklets on academic subjects accessible to teenagers. He contributed to the project booklets on introductions to mathematical logic and non-Euclidean geometry.

- Beno Arbel Program (2013–2020): Director of a program allowing middle and high school students to take undergraduate mathematics courses at Tel Aviv University.

- Israeli Mathematical Olympiad (2013–2019): Director of the training program for the Israeli team to the International Mathematics Olympiad.

- First Steps in Science (2020–present): Co-initiator of a program preparing Arabic-speaking teenagers for study in the Faculty of Exact Sciences at Tel Aviv University.

- One World Game Theory Seminar (2020–2023): Co-organizer of an international online seminar series, including a dedicated track for junior researchers, established during the COVID-19 pandemic.

- Israeli Chapter of the Game Theory Society (2012–2016): Co-founder and First Executive Officer.

== Selected publications ==
- Solan, E. (1999). Three-Player Absorbing Games. Mathematics of Operations Research, 24, 669–698.

- Solan, E. and Vieille, N. (2001). Quitting Games. Mathematics of Operations Research, 26, 265–285.

- Solan, E. and Yariv, L. (2004). Games with Espionage. Games and Economic Behavior, 47, 172–199.

- Shmaya, E. and Solan, E. (2004). Two Player Non Zero-Sum Stopping Games in Discrete Time. The Annals of Probability, 32, 2733–2764.

- Laraki, R. and Solan, E. (2004). Stopping Games in Continuous Time. SIAM Journal on Control and Optimization, 43, 1913–1922.

- Laraki, R., Solan, E. and Vieille, N. (2005). Continuous-Time Games of Timing. Journal of Economic Theory, 120, 206–238.

- Rosenberg, D., Solan, E. and Vieille, N. (2007). Social Learning in One-Arm Bandit Problems. Econometrica, 75, 1591–1611.

- Fibich, G., Gavious, A. and Solan E. (2012). An Averaging Principle for Second-Order Approximation of Heterogeneous Models with Homogeneous Models. Proceedings of the National Academy of Sciences of the USA, 109:48, 19545–19550.

- Cohen, A. and Solan E. (2013). Bandit Problems with L\'evy Processes. Mathematics of Operations Research, 38, 92–107.

- Ashkenazi-Golan, G., Flesch, J., Predtetchinski, A. and Solan, E. (2022). Existence of Equilibria in Repeated Games with Long-Run Payoffs. Proceedings of the National Academy of Sciences, 119:11, e2105867119.

- Flesch, J. and Solan, E. (2023). Equilibrium in Two-Player Stochastic Games with Shift-Invariant Payoffs. Journal de Mathématiques Pures et Appliquées, 179, 68–122.

- Alon, N., Gunby, B., He, X., Shmaya, E. and Solan, E. (2024). Identifying the Deviator. The Annals of Applied Probability, 34:5, 4694–4708.
