= Yehuda Ben-Meir =

Israeli academic and politician (1939–2025)

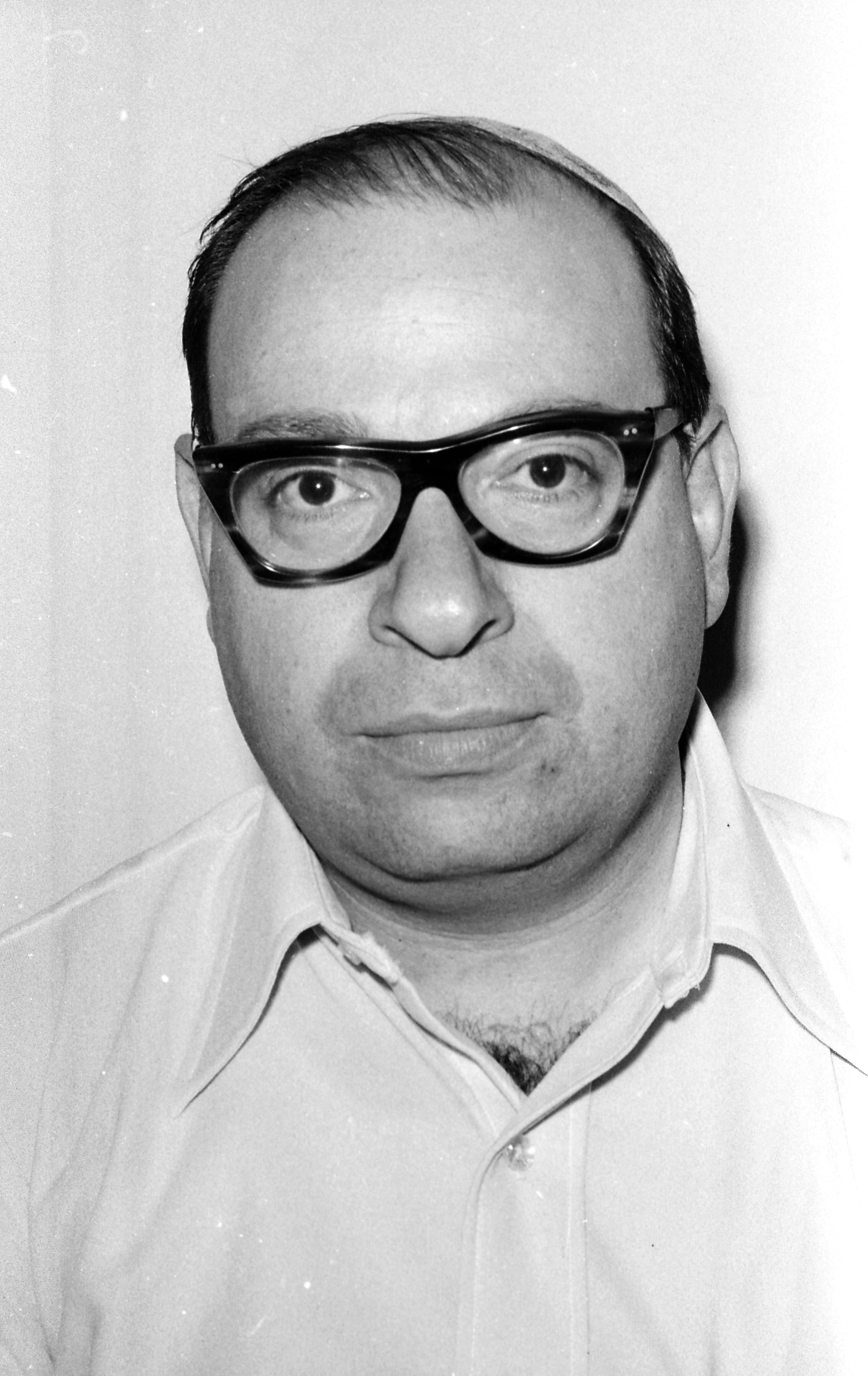
- Ben-Meir in 1977

Faction represented in the Knesset
- 1971–1984: National Religious Party
- 1984: Gesher – Zionist Religious Centre
- 1984: National Religious Party

Personal details
- Born: 27 July 1939 New York City, United States
- Died: 14 March 2025 (aged 85)

Yehuda Ben-Meir (Hebrew: יהודה בן-מאיר; 27 July 1939 – 14 March 2025) was an Israeli academic and politician who served as a member of the Knesset for the National Religious Party and Gesher – Zionist Religious Centre between 1971 and 1984.

== Biography ==
Born Yehuda Rosenberg in New York City in 1939, the son of Shlomo-Yisrael Rosenberg, Ben-Meir studied at the Yishuv HaHadash yeshiva in Tel Aviv, Yeshiva University and Columbia University, earning a doctorate in psychology. He emigrated to Israel in 1962 and worked as a lecturer in psychology at Bar-Ilan University until 1968.

One of the leaders of the Gesher youth faction of the National Religious Party (NRP), he was director of the party's youth bureau, a member of its actions committee and directorate (which he also chaired), as well as being a member of the world secretariat of Mizrachi and Hapoel HaMizrachi.

He was on the NRP list for the 1969 elections, but failed to win a seat. However, he entered the Knesset on 4 April 1971 as a replacement for his deceased father. He was re-elected in 1973, 1977, and 1981. In August 1981, he was appointed Deputy Minister of Foreign Affairs. In May 1984, he and Zevulun Hammer left the NRP to establish Gesher – Zionist Religious Centre, though both returned to the NRP two weeks later. He lost his seat in the July 1984 elections.

After leaving the Knesset, Ben-Meir became a senior lecturer, and also studied law, later becoming a practising lawyer. In 1988 he left the NRP again and was amongst the founders of Meimad, a left-wing religious Zionist party.

He died in 2025 at the age of 85.
