= Sergiu Hart =

Israeli mathematician and economist (born 1949)

- סרג'יו הרט
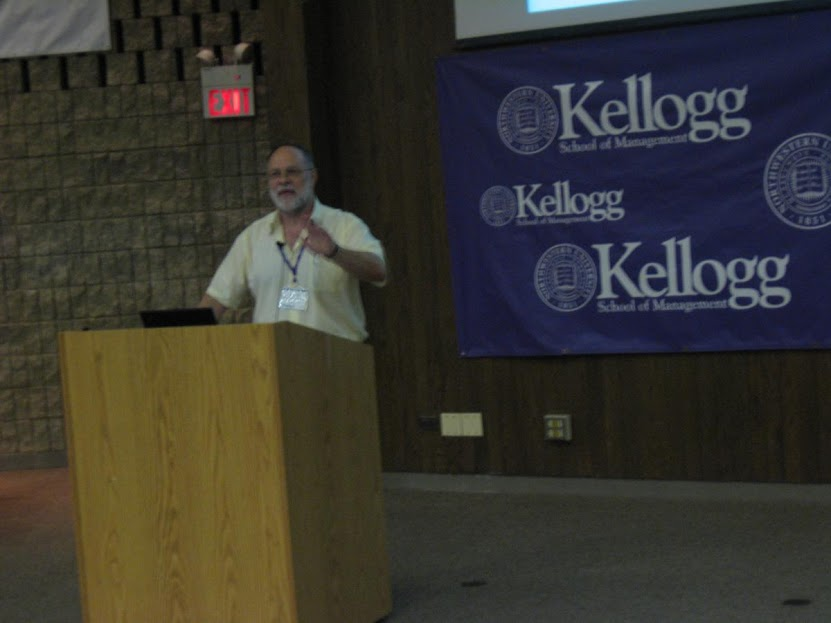
- Born: 1949 (age 76–77); Bucharest, Romania
- Education: Tel Aviv University
- Awards: Israel Defense Prize (1975); Rothschild Prize (1998); Israel Prize (2018)
- Scientific career
- Fields: Game theory
- Workplaces: Hebrew University of Jerusalem; Tel-Aviv University
- Theses: Values of Mixed Games (1971); Cooperative Game Theory Models of Economic Equilibrium (1976)
- Doctoral advisor: Robert J. Aumann
- Website: www.ma.huji.ac.il/hart/

Sergiu Hart (Hebrew: סרג'יו הרט; born 1949) is an Israeli mathematician and economist. He was the Chairperson of the Humanities Division of the Israel Academy of Sciences and Humanities (2019-2025), and President of the Game Theory Society (2008–2010). He is a Member of the Israel Academy of Sciences and Humanities, Member of Academia Europaea, International Honorary Member of the American Academy of Arts and Sciences, and International Member of the US National Academy of Sciences (NAS). He is emeritus professor of mathematics and emeritus professor of economics, and member of the Center for the Study of Rationality, at the Hebrew University of Jerusalem.

== Biography ==
Hart was born in Bucharest, Romania and immigrated to Israel in 1963. He received a B.Sc. in mathematics and statistics (summa cum laude, 1970) and an M.Sc. in mathematics (summa cum laude, 1971) from Tel Aviv University. His M.Sc. thesis was on the subject of "Values of Mixed Games" and was supervised by Robert Aumann, who was also his advisor in his doctoral thesis on "Cooperative Game Theory Models of Economic Equilibrium" (Ph.D., summa cum laude, 1976).

In 1979–1991 he was at the School of Mathematical Sciences of Tel Aviv University, as professor since 1985. He was an assistant professor at the Department of Economics, Department of Operations Research, and Institute for Mathematical Studies in the Social Sciences at Stanford University (1976–1979), and a visiting professor at the Department of Economics of Harvard University (1984–1985 and 1990–1991). Since 1991 he is a member of the Departments of Economics and Mathematics at the Hebrew University of Jerusalem, and he was the founding director of the Center for the Study of Rationality (1991–1999) there.

== Research contributions ==
His main area of research is game theory and economic theory, with additional contributions in mathematics, computer science, probability and statistics.

Among his major contributions are studies of strategic foundations of cooperation; strategic use of information in long-term interactions ("repeated games"); adaptive and evolutionary dynamics, particularly with boundedly rational agents; perfect economic competition and its relations to models of fair distribution; riskiness; forecasting and calibration; mechanism design with multiple goods.

Hart edited, with Robert J. Aumann, the first three volumes of the Handbook of Game Theory with Economic Applications (1992, 1994, 2002).

== Honors and awards ==
In 1998, he was awarded the Rothschild Prize in the Social Sciences.,

In 2018, he was awarded the Israel Prize in Economics and Statistics.

In 2020, he was awarded the ACM SIGecom Test of Time Award.

In 2006, he was elected Member of the Israel Academy of Sciences and Humanities.

From 2019 to 2025, he served as the Chairperson of the Humanities Division of the Israel Academy of Sciences and Humanities.

In 2012, he was elected Member of Academia Europaea.

In 2016, he was elected International Honorary Member of the American Academy of Arts and Sciences (USA).

In 2025, he was elected International Member of the National Academy of Sciences (USA).

In 1985, he was elected Fellow of the Econometric Society.

In 1999, Charter Member of the Game Theory Society.

From 2000 to 2005, Member of the First Council of the Game Theory Society.

In 2013, Fellow of the Society for the Advancement of Economic Theory.

In 2017, Fellow of the Game Theory Society and Member of the Advisory Board of the Game Theory Society.

In 2000, he was invited to give the Cowles Lecture at Yale University.

In 2003, he was invited to give the Walras-Bowley Lecture of the Econometric Society.

In 2008, Presidential Address, GAMES 2008 - The Third World Congress of the Game Theory Society.

In 2009, he was invited to give the Harris Lecture at Harvard University.

In 2011, he was invited to give the Kwan Chao-Chih Distinguished Lecture, Academy of Mathematics and Systems Science, Chinese Academy of Sciences, Beijing.

In 2012, he was invited to give the Algorithms, Combinatorics, and Optimization (ACO) Distinguished Lecture at Georgia Institute of Technology.

In 2013, he was invited to give the Don Patinkin Lecture at the Israeli Economic Association.

From 2005 to 2006, he served as President of the Israel Mathematical Union.

From 2006 to 2008, he served as Executive Vice President of the Game Theory Society.

From 2008 to 2010, he served as President of the Game Theory Society.

In 1975, he was awarded the Israel Defense Prize.

From 2010 to 2015, he was awarded an ERC (European Research Council) Advanced Investigator Grant.
