= Solans =

Solans is a surname. Notable people with the surname include:

- David Solans (born 1996), Spanish actor
- Eugenio Domingo Solans (1945–2004), Spanish economist and civil servant
- Jan Solans (born 1997), Spanish rally driver
- Josep Pintat-Solans (1925–2007), second Prime Minister of Andorra
- Nil Solans (born 1992), Spanish rally driver

== See also ==
- Solan (disambiguation)
