= Yitzhak Levy =

Israeli politician (born 1947)

Isaac Levy
- יצחק לוי
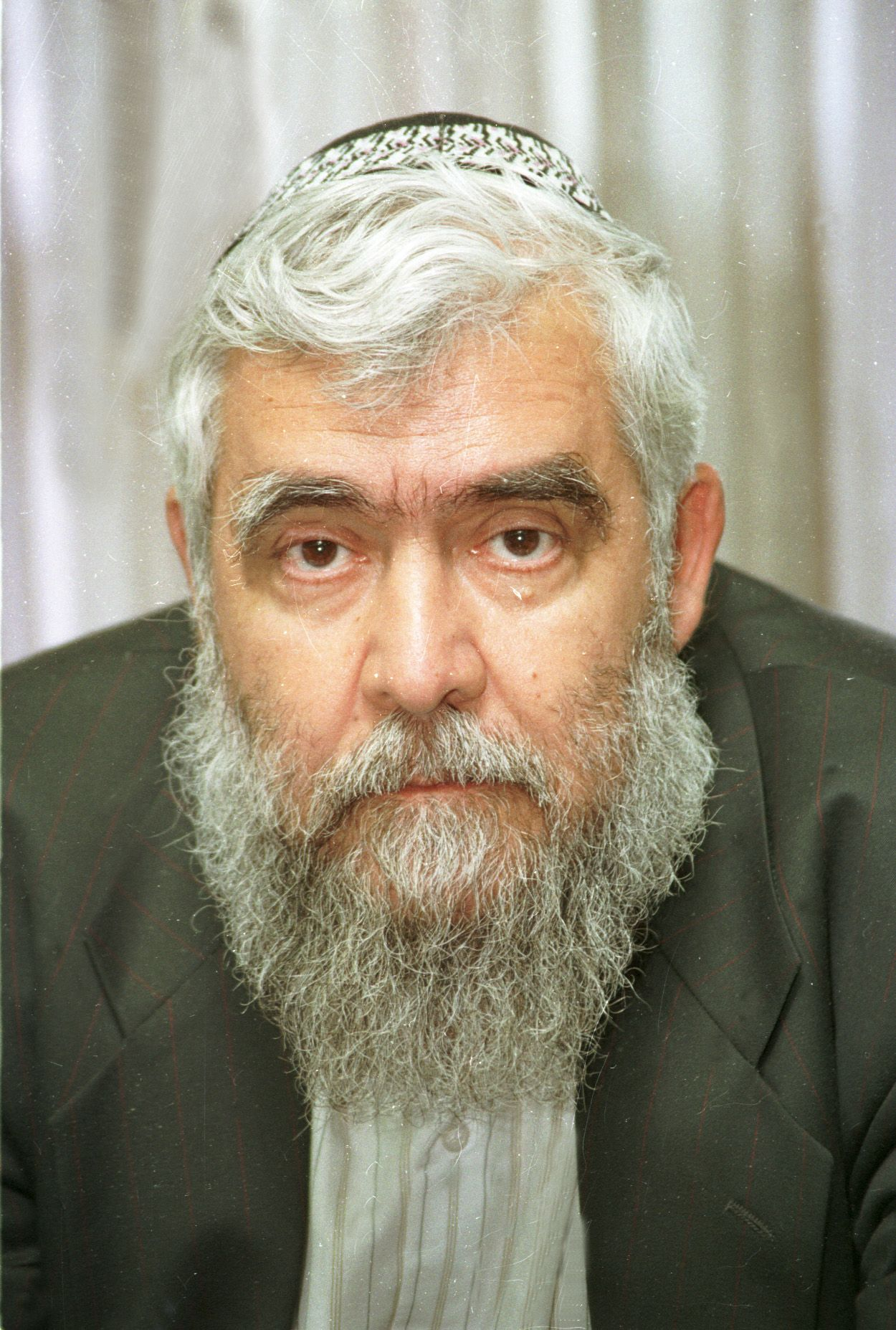

Ministerial roles
- 1996: Minister of Energy & Infrastructure
- 1996–1998: Minister of Transportation
- 1998: Minister of Religious Affairs
- 1998–1999: Minister of Education
- 1999–2000: Minister of Housing & Construction
- 2002: Minister without Portfolio
- 2002–2003: Minister of Tourism

Faction represented in the Knesset
- 1988–2005: National Religious Party
- 2005–2009: Ahi

Personal details
- Born: 6 June 1947 (age 78); Casablanca, Morocco

Yitzhak Levy (Hebrew: יצחק לוי; born 6 July 1947) is an Israeli Orthodox rabbi and politician who served as a member of the Knesset for the National Religious Party (NRP) and the Ahi faction of the National Union between 1988 and 2009. Between 1998 and 2002, he was NRP leader, and also held several ministerial portfolios.

== Biography ==
Yitzhak Levy was born in Casablanca in Morocco in 1947, the son of Daniel-Yitzhak Levy, who later served as a member of the Knesset for the National Religious Party. The family immigrated to Israel in 1957. He studied at Yeshivat Kerem B'Yavneh and Yeshivat Hakotel. He served as an officer in the IDF, achieving the rank of major. He was a member of the Bnei Akiva Executive and World Secretariat, and Secretary-General of the National Religious Movement from 1986 to 1995.

He was the Rabbi of the Bnei Akiva Talmudic College in Kfar Maimon, and was among the initiators of the establishment of the Jewish quarter in Jerusalem, and one of the founders of the Israeli settlement of Elon Moreh in the West Bank.

Levy is married, with five children, and lives in Kfar Maimon.

== Political career ==
He was elected to the Knesset in 1988 on the National Religious Party list. He was a member of the House Committee from 1988 to 1996, and the Labor and Social Welfare Committee from 1988 to 1992. He was also chairman the Ethics Committee and the children welfare lobby, as well as the Israel-Argentina Parliamentary Friendship League. Since 1988, he has been a member of the Committee on Constitution, Law, and Justice.

In June 1996, he was appointed Minister of Transportation by Prime Minister Benjamin Netanyahu. In February 1998, after the death of Zevulun Hammer, he became the leader of the NRP, and served as Minister of Education until July 1999. He also served as Minister of Religious Affairs, a position he held in rotation.

In July 1999, he was appointed Minister of Housing and Construction. Following his appointment, he resigned from the Knesset in order to allow the next person on the NRP list, Nahum Langental, to enter the Knesset. In July 2000, following the Camp David Summit, he resigned from the government.

On November 2, 2000, his 28-year-old daughter, Ayelet Hashahar Levy, was killed by a Palestinian car bomb in Jerusalem.

In April 2002, during Operation Defensive Shield, he resigned as leader of the NRP to make way for Effi Eitam, and was made Minister without Portfolio. From September 2002 until February 2003, he served as Minister of Tourism. In March 2003, he was appointed Deputy Minister in the Prime Minister's Office. However, in June 2004, he and Eitam resigned in protest against the disengagement plan. He and Eitam subsequently left the NRP, and founded a new religious-Zionist party, Ahi, which joined the National Union alliance.

In December 2008, Levy announced that he was retiring from politics, stating that the decision was made due to the new Jewish Home party not holding traditional primary elections, but instead relying on an internet-based vote.
