= Professors for a Strong Israel =

Group of academics in Israel

Professors for a Strong Israel is a group of academics in Israel. They describe themselves as a "non-partisan organization of academics united by a shared concern for the security and the Jewish character of the State of Israel."

The group was founded in 1988 but stepped up its activities after the signing of the Oslo Accords in 1993.

They are opposed to the creation of a Palestinian state and consider the removal of Israelis from Gaza to have been ethnic cleansing.

Notable members include Nobel Prize winner Robert Aumann and Knesset member Arie Eldad.
