= Stochastic game =

Concept in game theory

In game theory, a stochastic game (or Markov game) is a repeated game with probabilistic transitions played by one or more players. The game is played in a sequence of stages. At the beginning of each stage the game is in some state. The players select actions and each player receives a payoff that depends on the current state and the chosen actions. The game then moves to a new random state whose distribution depends on the previous state and the actions chosen by the players. The procedure is repeated at the new state and play continues for a finite or infinite number of stages. The total payoff to a player is often taken to be the discounted sum of the stage payoffs or the limit inferior of the averages of the stage payoffs.

Stochastic games were introduced by Lloyd Shapley in the early 1950s. They generalize Markov decision processes to multiple interacting decision makers, as well as strategic-form games to dynamic situations in which the environment changes in response to the players' choices.

== Two-player games ==
Stochastic two-player games on directed graphs are widely used for modeling and analysis of discrete systems operating in an unknown (adversarial) environment. Possible configurations of a system and its environment are represented as vertices, and the transitions correspond to actions of the system, its environment, or "nature". A run of the system then corresponds to an infinite path in the graph. Thus, a system and its environment can be seen as two players with antagonistic objectives, where one player (the system) aims at maximizing the probability of "good" runs, while the other player (the environment) aims at the opposite.

In many cases, there exists an equilibrium value of this probability, but optimal strategies for both players may not exist.

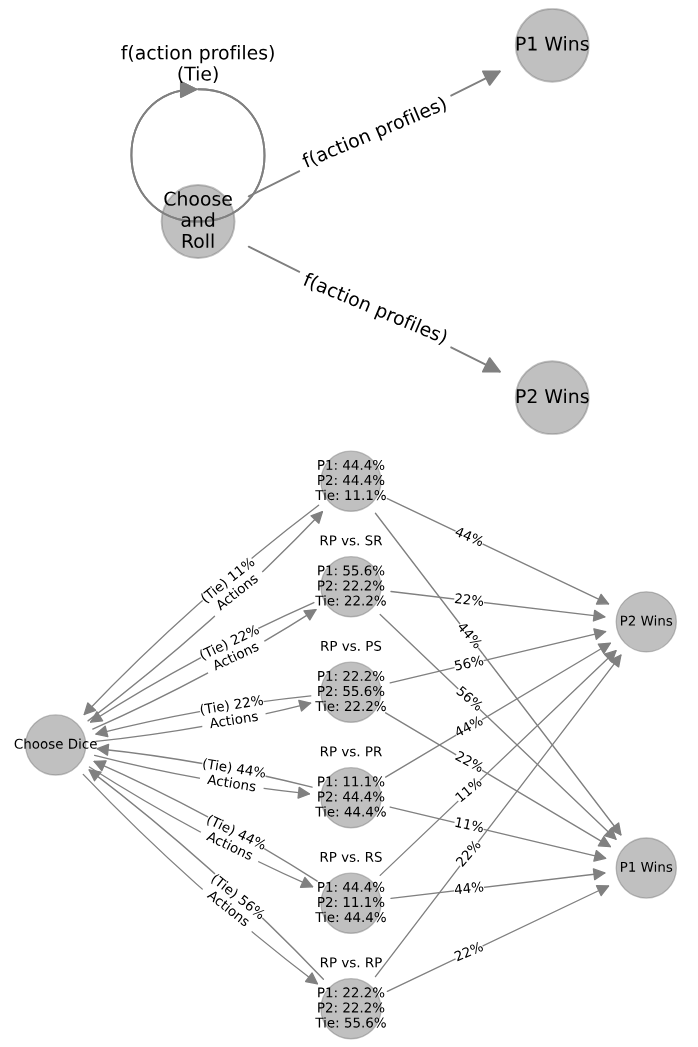
A modified game of rock paper scissors played with dice, shown generally in the first graph and more strictly in the second. Each player has a set of 6 dice, where 4 sides of each die has rock, paper or scissors, and 2 sides have one of the other options, so that the set of 6 dice contains every combination. "RP" means a die with 4 rock and 2 paper, and although both players may not choose this die, any two combinations are equivalent to a combination of any basis die and some other die, so BR is used as a basis. Ties let the players choose a new die if they would like. The more expansive graph is needed because the probability of the players winning is influenced by which die they and their opponents choose. The probability of each outcome is therefore a function of the action profiles of the players during the "choose and roll" stage.

We introduce basic concepts and algorithmic questions studied in this area, and we mention some long-standing open problems. Then, we mention selected recent results.

== Theory ==
The ingredients of a stochastic game are: a finite set of players $I$; a state space $S$ (either a finite set or a measurable space $(S,{\mathcal S})$); for each player $i\in I$, an action set $A^i$ (either a finite set or a measurable space $(A^i,{\mathcal A}^i)$); a transition probability $P$ from $S\times A$, where $A=\times_{i\in I}A^i$ is the action profiles, to $S$, where $P(S \mid s, a)$ is the probability that the next state is in $S$ given the current state $s$ and the current action profile $a$; and a payoff function $g$ from $S\times A$ to $R^I$, where the $i$-th coordinate of $g$, $g^i$, is the payoff to player $i$ as a function of the state $s$ and the action profile $a$.

The game starts at some initial state $s_1$. At stage $t$, players first observe $s_t$, then simultaneously choose actions $a^i_t\in A^i$, then observe the action profile $a_t=(a^i_t)_i$, and then nature selects $s_{t+1}$ according to the probability $P(\cdot\mid s_t,a_t)$. A play of the stochastic game, $s_1,a_1,\ldots,s_t,a_t,\ldots$, defines a stream of payoffs $g_1,g_2,\ldots$, where $g_t=g(s_t,a_t)$.

The discounted game $\Gamma_\lambda$ with discount factor $\lambda$ ($0<\lambda \leq 1$) is the game where the payoff to player $i$ is $\lambda \sum_{t=1}^{\infty}(1-\lambda)^{t-1}g^i_t$. The $n$-stage game is the game where the payoff to player $i$ is $\bar{g}^i_n:=\frac1n\sum_{t=1}^ng^i_t$.

The value $v_n(s_1)$, respectively $v_{\lambda}(s_1)$, of a two-person zero-sum stochastic game $\Gamma_n$, respectively $\Gamma_{\lambda}$, with finitely many states and actions exists, and Truman Bewley and Elon Kohlberg (1976) proved that $v_n(s_1)$ converges to a limit as $n$ goes to infinity and that $v_{\lambda}(s_1)$ converges to the same limit as $\lambda$ goes to $0$.

The "undiscounted" game $\Gamma_\infty$ is the game where the payoff to player $i$ is the "limit" of the averages of the stage payoffs. Some precautions are needed in defining the value of a two-person zero-sum $\Gamma_{\infty}$ and in defining equilibrium payoffs of a non-zero-sum $\Gamma_{\infty}$. The uniform value $v_{\infty}$ of a two-person zero-sum stochastic game $\Gamma_\infty$ exists if for every $\varepsilon>0$ there is a positive integer $N$ and a strategy pair $\sigma_{\varepsilon}$ of player 1 and $\tau_{\varepsilon}$ of player 2 such that for every $\sigma$ and $\tau$ and every $n\geq N$ the expectation of $\bar{g}^i_n$ with respect to the probability on plays defined by $\sigma_{\varepsilon}$ and $\tau$ is at least $v_{\infty} -\varepsilon$, and the expectation of $\bar{g}^i_n$ with respect to the probability on plays defined by $\sigma$ and $\tau_{\varepsilon}$ is at most $v_{\infty} +\varepsilon$. Jean-François Mertens and Abraham Neyman (1981) proved that every two-person zero-sum stochastic game with finitely many states and actions has a uniform value.

== Existence of a equilibrium ==
=== Nash equilibrium ===
If there is a finite number of players and the action sets and the set of states are finite, then a stochastic game with a finite number of stages always has a Nash equilibrium. The same is true for a game with infinitely many stages if the total payoff is the discounted sum.

The non-zero-sum stochastic game $\Gamma_\infty$ has a uniform equilibrium payoff $v_{\infty}$ if for every $\varepsilon>0$ there is a positive integer $N$ and a strategy profile $\sigma$ such that for every unilateral deviation by a player $i$, i.e., a strategy profile $\tau$ with $\sigma^j=\tau^j$ for all $j\neq i$, and every $n\geq N$ the expectation of $\bar{g}^i_n$ with respect to the probability on plays defined by $\sigma$ is at least $v^i_{\infty} -\varepsilon$, and the expectation of $\bar{g}^i_n$ with respect to the probability on plays defined by $\tau$ is at most $v^i_{\infty} +\varepsilon$. Nicolas Vieille has shown that all two-person stochastic games with finite state and action spaces have a uniform equilibrium payoff.

The non-zero-sum stochastic game $\Gamma_\infty$ has a limiting-average equilibrium payoff $v_{\infty}$ if for every $\varepsilon>0$ there is a strategy profile $\sigma$ such that for every unilateral deviation by a player $i$, the expectation of the limit inferior of the averages of the stage payoffs with respect to the probability on plays defined by $\sigma$ is at least $v^i_{\infty} -\varepsilon$, and the expectation of the limit superior of the averages of the stage payoffs with respect to the probability on plays defined by $\tau$ is at most $v^i_{\infty} +\varepsilon$. Jean-François Mertens and Abraham Neyman (1981) proves that every two-person zero-sum stochastic game with finitely many states and actions has a limiting-average value, and Nicolas Vieille has shown that all two-person stochastic games with finite state and action spaces have a limiting-average equilibrium payoff. In particular, these results imply that these games have a value and an approximate equilibrium payoff, called the liminf-average (respectively, the limsup-average) equilibrium payoff, when the total payoff is the limit inferior (or the limit superior) of the averages of the stage payoffs.

Whether every stochastic game with finitely many players, states, and actions, has a uniform equilibrium payoff, or a limiting-average equilibrium payoff, or even a liminf-average equilibrium payoff, is a challenging open question.

=== Minmax-acceptable profiles ===
A strategy profile $s^*$ is called minmax-acceptable if the utility of each player in $s^*$ is at least the player's minmax value:

$$u_i(s^*) \geq \min_{s_{-i}}  \max_{s_i} u_i(s_{-i}, s_i)$$.

Every Nash equilibrium is minmax acceptable, as in a Nash equilibrium the following stronger property is satisfied:

$$u_i(s^*) = \max_{s_i} u_i(s^*_{-i}, s_i)$$.

But the opposite is not necessarily true. Solan and Flesch and Solan proved general existence results of Minmax-acceptable profiles in stochastic games. This is in contrast to Nash equilibria, which are not known to exist in general.

=== Other equilibrium concepts ===
A Markov perfect equilibrium is a refinement of the concept of sub-game perfect Nash equilibrium to stochastic games.

== Stochastic Bayesian games ==
Stochastic games have been combined with Bayesian games to model uncertainty over player strategies. The resulting stochastic Bayesian game model is solved via a recursive combination of the Bayesian Nash equilibrium equation and the Bellman optimality equation.

== Stopping games ==
E. B. Dynkin presented the following problem in game theory related to stopping of stochastic processes. Suppose ${\mathcal F}_n, n=0,1,\ldots$, be an increasing sequence of σ-algebras in some probability space $(\Omega,{\mathcal F},{\mathbf P} )$, where ${\mathcal F}$ is containing all the ${\mathcal F}_n$. Two players observe stochastic sequences $\{X_n\}_{n=1}^\infty$, $\{\varPhi_n\}_{n=1}^\infty$, i.e. functions measurable with respect to $\{{\mathcal F}_n\}_{n=0}^\infty$. A game can be stopped at time n by the first player if $\varPhi_n\geq 0$ and by the second player if $\varPhi_n< 0$. If the game is stopped at time n, then the first player receives from the second player $x_n$. Player 1 seeks to maximize the expected payoff, and player 2 seeks to minimize it.

Let $\tau$ be Markov time with respect to the filtration $\{{\mathcal F}_n\}_{n=0}^\infty$and $\chi_A$ be the characteristic function of the event $A$. Denote $\mathcal T$ the set of all stopping times with respect to the filtration $\{{\mathcal F}_n\}_{n=0}^\infty$, $\Lambda=\{\lambda=\tau\chi_{\varPhi_\tau\geqslant 0}, \tau\in {\mathcal T}\}$, and $\Mu=\{\mu=\tau\chi_{\varPhi_\tau< 0}, \tau\in {\mathcal T}\}$. Let $\lambda$ be the stopping time selected by the first ($\mu$ resp. by the second) player. The payoff, payment of the second player to the first, is defined then $R(\lambda,\mu)={\mathbf E} X_{\lambda\land\mu}$.

Under the condition that ${\mathbf E}(\sup_n|X_n|)<\infty$, Dynkin proved that the value of the game $v=\sup_{\lambda\in\Lambda}\inf_{\mu\in\Mu} R(\lambda, \mu )$ exists. He constructed ε-optimal strategies, and introduced several conditions for the existence of optimal strategies (for extension see Neveu and Yasuda ).

== Applications ==
Stochastic games have applications in economics, evolutionary biology and computer networks. They are generalizations of repeated games which correspond to the special case where there is only one state.

== See also ==
- Stochastic process
