= Zevulun Hammer =

Israeli politician (1936–1998)

- זבולון המר
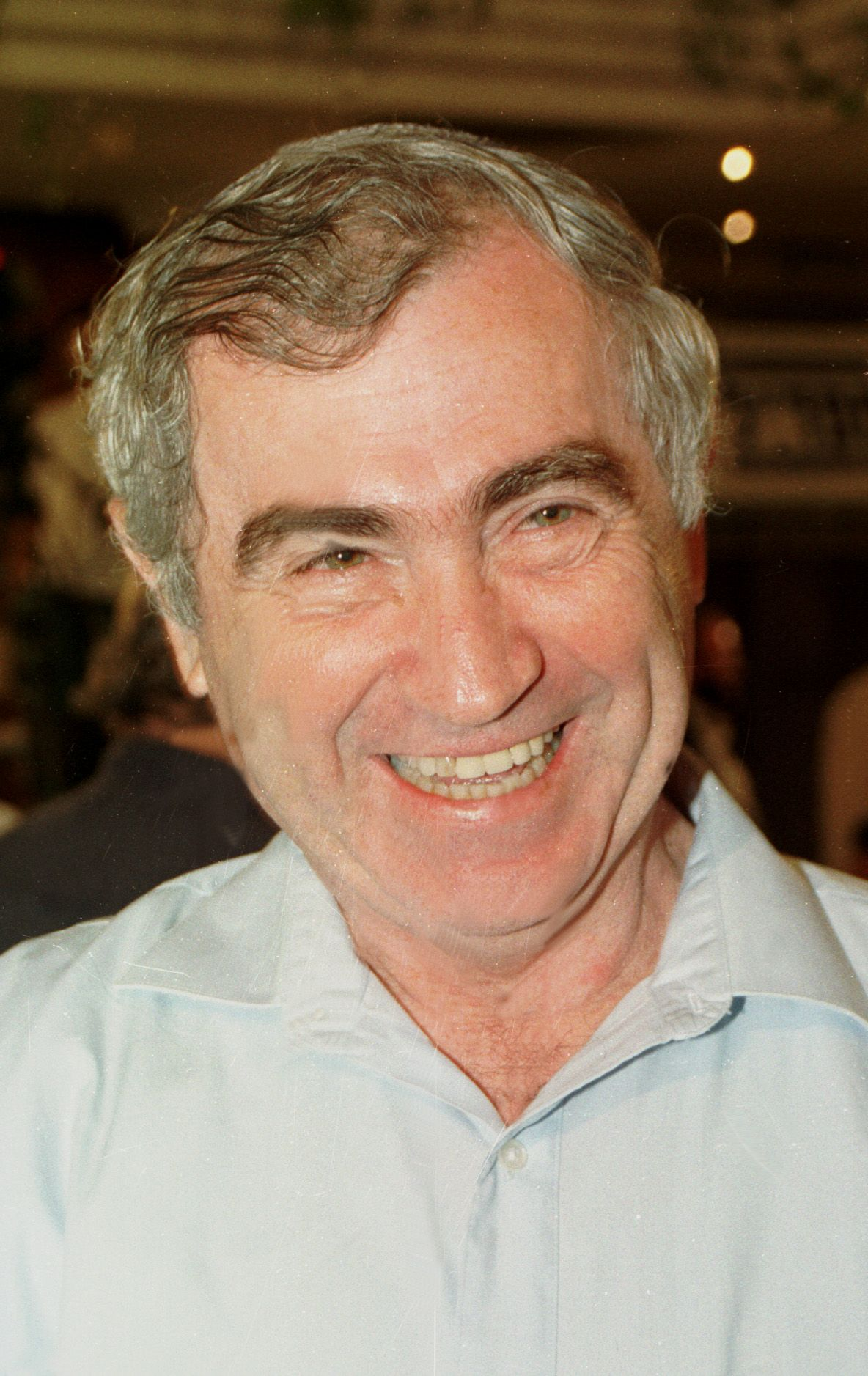

Ministerial roles
- 1975–1976: Minister of Welfare
- 1977–1984: Minister of Education and Culture
- 1986–1988: Minister of Religious Affairs
- 1988–1990: Minister of Religious Affairs
- 1990–1992: Minister of Education and Culture
- 1996–1998: Deputy Prime Minister
- 1996–1998: Minister of Education, Culture & Sport
- 1997–1998: Minister of Religious Affairs

Faction represented in the Knesset
- 1969–1984: National Religious Party
- 1984: Gesher – Zionist Religious Centre
- 1984–1998: National Religious Party

Personal details
- Born: 31 May 1936 Haifa, Mandatory Palestine
- Died: 20 January 1998 (aged 61) Jerusalem, Israel

Zevulun Hammer (Hebrew: זבולון המר; 31 May 1936 – 20 January 1998) was an Israeli politician, minister and Deputy Prime Minister.

== Biography ==
Hammer was born in Haifa during the Mandate era. He was an active member of the Bnei Akiva youth movement (which he led), and served in the Israeli Armored Corps in a Nahal programme. He graduated from Bar-Ilan University with a BA in Judaism and Bible, as well as a teaching certificate and worked as a teacher. At the university, he headed the Student Union and was a member of the Presidium of the Israeli Students Association and the World Union of Jewish Students.

== Political career ==
Hammer was first elected to the Knesset in 1969 as a member of the National Religious Party. He became Deputy Minister of Education and Culture in January 1973. In November 1975 he was appointed Minister of Welfare, but in December 1976 his party resigned from the cabinet

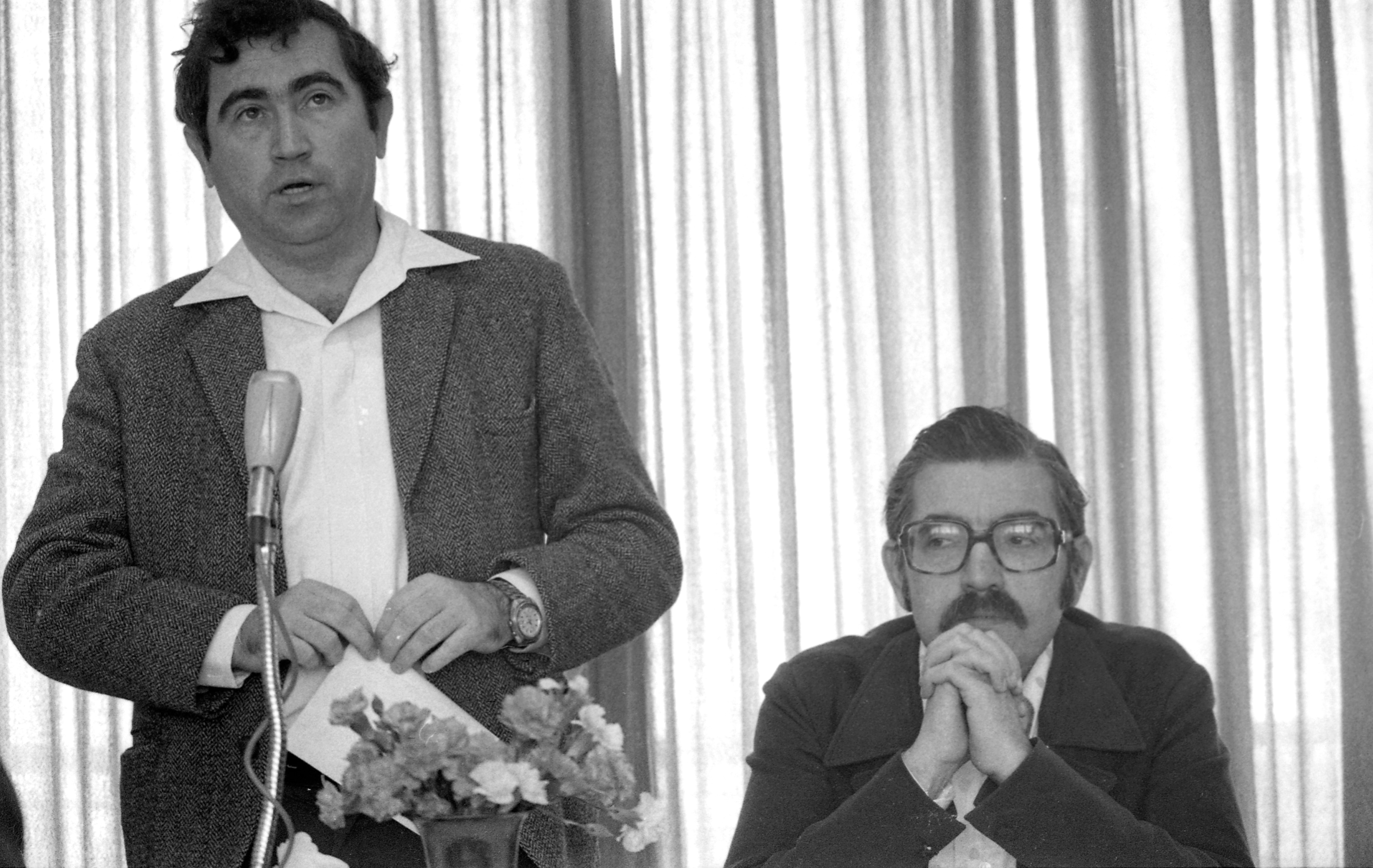
Hammer as Minister of Welfare (1975)

After the 1977 elections he was appointed Minister of Education, a role he retained until September 1984. For a brief period during the 10th Knesset, Hammer and Yehuda Ben-Meir broke away from the NRP and formed a new faction, Gesher – Zionist Religious Centre; however, they returned to the NRP after two weeks.

In October 1986 he became Minister of Religious Affairs, and in 1990 was re-appointed Education Minister. He lost his place in the cabinet after the NRP were left out of Yitzhak Rabin's government, but regained it following the 1996 elections, when he was appointed Education Minister and Deputy Prime Minister. In August 1997 he was also appointed Minister of Religious Affairs.

== Death ==
At age 61, Hammer was diagnosed with cancer and died in office on 20 January 1998, leaving a wife and four children. He was buried in the Mount of Olives Jewish Cemetery.

=== Commemoration ===
The Mishkenot Zevulun neighborhood in eastern Netanya is named after him as well as a neighborhood in the Ma'ale Michamsh settlement

Several streets are named after him in Israel - in the neighborhood where he lives in Bnei Brak ("Zevulon Hamer Boulevard"), Givat Shmuel, Gedera, Petah Tikva and Kiryat Motzkin. In 2013, a street was named after him in Kiryat HaLeom in Jerusalem
