= Effi Eitam =

Israeli politician (born 1952)

- אפי איתם

Ministerial roles
- 2002: Minister without Portfolio
- 2002–2003: Minister of National Infrastructure
- 2003–2004: Minister of Housing and Construction

Faction represented in the Knesset
- 2003–2005: National Religious Party
- 2005–2006: Renewed National Religious Zionist Party
- 2006–2008: National Union
- 2008–2009: Ahi

Personal details
- Born: 25 July 1952 (age 74) Ein Gev, Israel

Efraim "Effi" Eitam (Hebrew: אפרים "אפי" איתם; born 25 July 1952) is an Israeli brigadier general, former commander of the 91st Division, and politician. A former leader of the National Religious Party, he later led a breakaway faction, Ahi, which merged into Likud in 2009. He served as a member of the Knesset between 2003 and 2009.

== Biography ==
A Hardal Israeli, he was born in kibbutz Ein Gev and received a secular education. When he was old enough, Eitam joined the Israel Defense Forces. Eitam has an M.A. in political science and in International Relations. He is also a former student of the Mercaz HaRav yeshiva, and the Royal Military Academy Sandhurst. He is married, has eight children, and lives in the Israeli settlement of Nov in the Golan Heights.

=== Military career ===
Brigadier General Eitam had a 29-year military career. He was drafted into the Israel Defense Forces in 1971 and volunteered for the Shayetet 13 naval commando force, but was dismissed after a year, and did his military service in the Golani Brigade. He was sent to Officer Candidate School, and in 1973, he was commissioned as an infantry officer and returned to the Golani Brigade. During the Yom Kippur War, he served as a platoon leader in the brigade's 12th Battalion and fought with his sergeant to stop Syrian tanks from penetrating the Golan Heights' Nafah base, using three bazooka projectiles and a heavy machine gun, and later rescued the wounded from Nafah. For his heroism, he was awarded the Medal of Distinguished Service. Later on, Eitam led the brigade's reconnaissance company during Operation Entebbe. During the 1982 Lebanon War, he led an officers' school battalion and a brigade, and afterwards, he commanded the Golani Brigade's 12th Battalion in counter-guerrilla operations in Southern Lebanon. During the First Intifada, he commanded the Givati Brigade.

In 1988, Israeli Defense Minister Yitzhak Rabin ordered the Israeli Army to beat Palestinian rioters. Eitam was heard over a radio telling his troops to beat and break the bones of a 21-year-old Palestinian prisoner named Ayyad Aqel. They beat him to death. An IDF court-martial convicted four of his soldiers, who testified against him. The Military Advocate General severely reprimanded Eitam and recommended that he never be promoted. Despite that, the IDF's Chief of General Staff, Ehud Barak, decided to promote him to the rank of brigadier general. During the years 1997–1999, Eitam commanded the 91st Division in counter-guerrilla activity in the South Lebanon security zone. He left the Army in December 2000. His second son, Itamar Eitam, was elected with the Religious Zionist Party in the 2026 Israeli legislative election. and Talmud from Bar-Ilan University.

=== Political career ===
After his retirement from military service, Eitam entered politics, joining the National Religious Party. Despite not being a member of the Knesset, he was appointed a Minister without Portfolio on 8 April 2002, serving until 18 September that year, when he became Minister of National Infrastructure.

In 2002, Eitam called for Yasser Arafat to be killed. Of Palestinian leader Marwan Barghouti, then being investigated by Israel, he said, "Take him out to an orchard and shoot him in the head." He was first elected to the Knesset in January 2003, and was appointed Minister of Housing and Construction in March 2003.

==== Disengagement plan and NRP split ====
On 10 June 2004, Eitam and Yitzhak Levy quit the government to protest the disengagement plan. However, the National Religious Party refused to leave the coalition. Eventually, Eitam and Levi left the NRP, too, and formed the Renewed Religious National Zionist Party, later renamed Ahi, which would later join the National Union – a Knesset list of right-wing parties.

In a harsh speech delivered on 11 January 2005, Eitam called Prime Minister Ariel Sharon a "refuser of democracy" ("סרבן דמוקרטיה"), and attacked him for refusing to conduct a national poll on the plan. Eitam claimed Sharon was promoting the disengagement plan by threatening and firing objectors, and by making corrupt deals. Eitam also claimed that the left was running an incitement campaign against the settlers, which include provocations and calls to spill their blood, in order to delegitimize that right-wing campaign against the disengagement plan. Despite the harsh criticism, Eitam denounced military refusal and violence. He concluded that at the end of struggle, "If you don't listen to the call to bring back the decision to the healthy and strong people, we shall send you home, and it will be painful and shameful, that will erase the achievements of your manhood."

In March 2005, after the Israeli Southern Command issued a decree forbidding relocation to the Gaza Strip, Eitam announced his intention to go and live in Gush Katif in order to reinforce the settlers and help prevent their eviction. Eventually, over Passover, Eitam moved to the Netzer Hazani settlement in the Gaza Strip. Left-wing members of the Knesset denounced Eitam's move, but the speaker of the house, Reuven Rivlin, said that the move fell under the immunity members of the Knesset have. After the evacuation of Netzer Hazani, Eitam moved to another Gaza Strip settlement, Netzarim, and accompanied them during their evacuation.

Because of his objection to military refusal and violence, Eitam was a negotiator between the opposers to the plan and Israeli security forces. He arranged a massive weapons recall in all the settlement due to be removed, in order to prevent any chance of bullets being fired by accident or the heat of the moment. He declared that the settlers would not use violence against Israeli security officers. Eitam also insisted that the removal forces would be unarmed. He explained his actions:

"It is about the expulsion of thousands of people from their homes. It is important to reach negotiation and discussion, it is important to shape the rules of the struggle in such a way that it will be conducted with determination, and on the other hand won't pull Israel to the abyss from which there is no return. It is not about acceptance with the disengagement [plan], but on the contrary, it is a struggle of multitude of people who will struggle with responsibility."

In July 2005, Eitam initiated a "struggle treaty", and got members of the Knesset and rabbis to sign it. The treaty set the rules of struggle against the disengagement [plan] and the red lines. The treaty declared rejection of any kind of violence:

"Our struggle will be innocent of any form of violence. No one shall use physical or verbal violence against Israel Defense Forces soldiers, Israeli Police officers, and security forces members."

In addition, it was decided that the protest will be done unarmed, in order to prevent blood spilling or the use of firearms. The treaty was distributed in thousands of copies to the ten of thousands of participants of the "joining march" to Kfar Maimon.

On 25 August 2005, Eitam was quoted as explaining that the reason there was no violence was not the security forces, but the settlers' own restraint and decision not to use violence. Eitam rebuked those who said that the settlers didn't use violence because they were afraid from the multitude of officers, and said: "We were not afraid from the multitude of cops and horses. It is ridiculous to think that our people, with swift boys, war-though men, and its wives and men, are scorned by mortar shells, explosive charges. and graves, will be afraid of physical confrontation with the cops. This shallow and evil claim miss the main thing, and therefore so dangerous.

Prior to the 2009 elections, Ahi merged into Likud, allowing Eitam to pass his election financing to the party. However, Eitam decided to not run in this election.

==== Amona ====
On 2 February 2006, Eitam was injured when Israeli police tried to disperse a protest of thousands of Israeli settlers who were blocking the demolition of nine homes in the Israeli settlement of Amona in the West Bank. The protest became violent, and Eitam, who was one of three Israeli nationalist MKs amongst the crowds, was knocked down. Eitam was hospitalized with minor injuries.

==== Pro removal of Arabs from Israeli politics and West Bank ====
After being re-elected on the joint National Union-National Religious Party list, Eitam caused controversy during a memorial ceremony for a fallen Israeli soldier on 10 September 2006, saying, "We'll have to expel the overwhelming majority of West Bank Arabs from here and remove Israeli Arabs from political system", and, "We have raised a fifth column, a group of traitors". Attorney-General Menachem Mazuz warned Eitam at the time that criminal charges could be brought against him if he repeated the statements.

==== 2008 Ahi merger with Likud ====
In December 2008, Eitam and his Ahi political party merged with the Likud party. In 2009–2010, he visited a series of US campuses as Israeli Prime Minister Benjamin Netanyahu's "Special Emissary" to the "Caravan for Democracy" program of the Jewish National Fund.

== Ideology ==
=== Arabs ===
Eitam has called Israeli Arabs a "cancer":

"[T]he Israeli Arabs are in large measure the ticking bomb beneath the whole democratic Israeli order inside the Green Line. Even today, in the Galilee and the Negev, a de facto autonomy of theirs is being created, which could in practice turn Israel into the bubble of Metropolitan Tel Aviv.… Therefore, I say that the State of Israel today faces an existential threat that is characterized by being an elusive threat, and elusive threats by their nature resemble cancer. Cancer is a type of illness in which most of the people who die from it die because they were diagnosed too late. By the time you grasp the size of the threat, it is already too late to deal with it."

Commenting on this, the veteran Israeli journalist, Akiva Eldar, wrote in Haaretz, "The fact that the Nazis were especially fond of this [cancer] metaphor is probably not lost on the general [public]."

In 2004, Eitam called the Palestinians "dark forces", and said: "We will have to kill them all... I don't mean all the Palestinians, but the ones with evil in their heads." In 2002, the Israeli Army used Nidal Abu Muihsein as a human shield, causing his death; Eitam called this "very moral". In October 2005, Eitam opposed a Supreme Court of Israel ruling that banned the IDF from using Palestinians as human shields, stating that, "Supreme court judges demonstrated today that their pity for the cruel will prove cruel to the merciful and will expose Israeli soldiers to more danger". In November 2006, he called for an expulsion of most Palestinians from the West Bank: "Expel most of the Judea and Samaria Arabs from here. We cannot be with all these Arabs, and we cannot give up the land." In March 2008, he called for the expulsion of Israeli Arab members of the Knesset: "One day, we will expel you to Gaza from this house and from the national home of the Jewish people."

=== Iran ===
Eitam has called on the U.S. to attack Iran and destroy its suspected nuclear weapons program, adding that Israel was well-prepared to take such action alone, as "a nuclear Iran is not an option for Israel". In February 2007, he stated that in three to four years, Iran would "have a [nuclear] bomb and the missile to deliver it".
