= Abraham Neyman =

Israeli mathematician (born 1949)

- אברהם ניימן
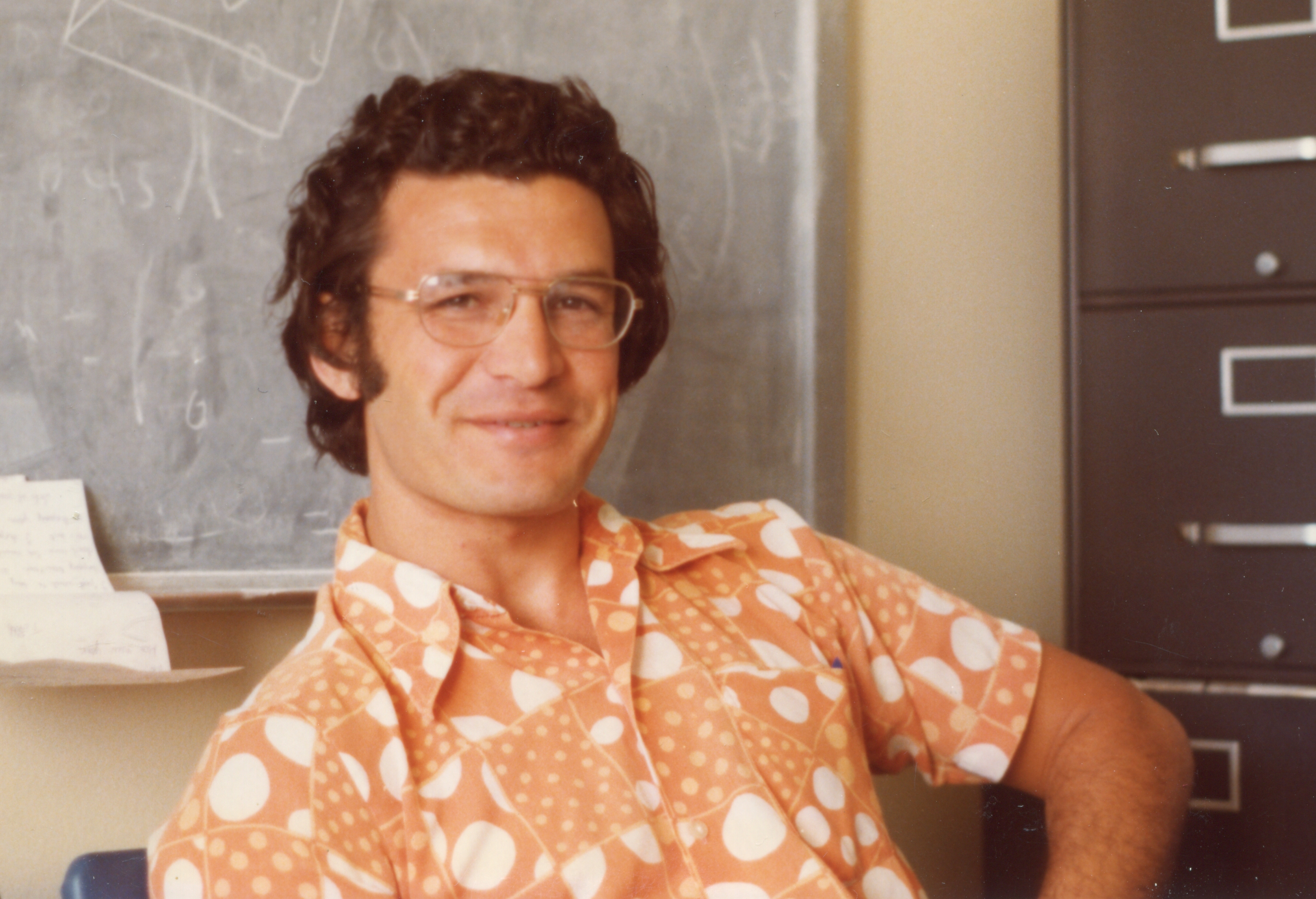
- Neyman in 1978
- Born: June 14, 1949 (age 77); Israel
- Education: Hebrew University of Jerusalem
- Scientific career
- Fields: Mathematics; Game theory
- Workplaces: Hebrew University of Jerusalem
- Doctoral advisor: Robert Aumann

Abraham Neyman (Hebrew: אברהם ניימן; born June 14, 1949) is an Israeli mathematician and game theorist, Professor of Mathematics at the Federmann Center for the Study of Rationality and the Einstein Institute of Mathematics at the Hebrew University of Jerusalem. He served as president of the Israeli Chapter of the Game Theory Society (2014–2018).

== Biography ==
Neyman received his BSc in mathematics in 1970 and his MSc in mathematics in 1972 from the Hebrew University. His MSc thesis was on the subject of “The Range of a Vector Measure” and was supervised by Joram Lindenstrauss. His PhD thesis, "Values of Games with a Continuum of Players," was completed under Robert Aumann in 1977.

Neyman has been professor of mathematics at the Hebrew University since 1982, including serving as the chairman of the institute of mathematics 1992–1994, as well as holding a professorship in economics, 1982–1990. He has been a member of the Center for the Study of Rationality at the Hebrew University since its inception in 1991. He held various positions at Stony Brook University of New York, 1985–2001. He has also held positions and has been visiting scholar at Cornell University, University of California at Berkeley, Stanford University, the Graduate School of Business Administration at Harvard University, and Ohio State University.

Neyman has had 12 graduate students complete Ph.D. theses under his supervision, five at Stony Brook University and seven at the Hebrew University. Neyman has also served as the Game Theory Area Editor for the journal Mathematics of Operations Research (1987–1993) and on the editorial board for Games and Economic Behavior (1993–2001) and the International Journal of Game Theory (2001–2007).

== Awards and honors ==
Neyman has been a fellow of the Econometric Society since 1989.

The Game Theory Society released, in March 2016, a special issue of the International Journal of Game Theory in honour of Neyman, "in recognition of his important contributions to game theory". A Festschrift conference in Neyman's honour was held at Hebrew University in June 2015, on the occasion of Neyman's 66th birthday. He gave the inaugural von-Neumann lecture at the 2008 Congress of the Game Theory Society as well as delivering it at the 2012 World Congress on behalf of the recently deceased Jean-Francois Mertens.

His Ph.D. thesis won two prizes from the Hebrew University: the 1977 Abraham Urbach prize for distinguished thesis in mathematics and the 1979 Aharon Katzir prize (for the best Ph. D. thesis in the Faculties of Exact Science, Mathematics, Agriculture and Medicine). In addition, Neyman won the Israeli under 20 chess championship in 1966.

== Research contributions ==
Neyman has made numerous contributions to game theory, including to stochastic games, the Shapley value, and repeated games.

=== Stochastic games ===
Together with Jean-Francois Mertens, he proved the existence of the uniform value of zero-sum undiscounted stochastic games. This work is considered one of the most important works in the theory of stochastic games, solving a problem that had been open for over 20 years. Together with Elon Kohlberg, he applied operator techniques to study convergence properties of the discounted and finite stage values. Recently, he has pioneered a model of stochastic games in continuous time and derived uniform equilibrium existence results. He also co-edited, together with Sylvain Sorin, a comprehensive collection of works in the field of stochastic games.

=== Repeated games ===
Neyman has made many contributions to the theory of repeated games. One idea that appears, in different contexts, in some of his papers, is that the model of an infinitely repeated game serves also as a powerful paradigm for a long finitely repeated game. A related insight appears in a 1999 paper, where he showed that in a long finitely repeated game, an exponentially small deviation from common knowledge of the number of repetitions is enough to dramatically alter the equilibrium analysis, producing a folk-theorem-like result.

Neyman is one of the pioneers and a most notable leader of the study of repeated games under complexity constraints. In his seminal paper he showed that bounded memory can justify cooperation in a finitely repeated prisoner's dilemma game. His paper was followed by many others who started working on bounded memory games. Most notable was Neyman's M.Sc. student Elchanan Ben-Porath who was the first to shed light on the strategic value of bounded complexity.

The two main models of bounded complexity, automaton size and recall capacity, continued to pose intriguing open problems in the following decades. A major breakthrough was achieved when Neyman and his Ph.D. student Daijiro Okada proposed a new approach to these problems, based on information theoretic techniques, introducing the notion of strategic entropy. His students continued to employ Neyman's entropy technique to achieve a better understanding of repeated games under complexity constraints. Neyman's information theoretic approach opened new research areas beyond bounded complexity. A classic example is the communication game he introduced jointly with Olivier Gossner and Penelope Hernandez.

=== The Shapley value ===
Neyman has made numerous fundamental contributions to the theory of the value. In a "remarkable tour-de-force of combinatorial reasoning", he proved the existence of an asymptotic value for weighted majority games. The proof was facilitated by his fundamental contribution to renewal theory. In subsequent work Neyman proved that many of the assumptions made in these works can be relaxed, while showing that others are essential.

Neyman proved the diagonality of continuous values, which had many implications on further developments of the theory. Together with Pradeep Dubey and Robert James Weber he studied the theory of semivalues, and separately demonstrated its importance in political economy. Together with Pradeep Dubey he characterized the well-known phenomenon of value correspondence, a fundamental notion in economics, originating already in Edgeworth's work and Adam Smith before him. In loose terms, it essentially states that in a large economy consisting of many economically insignificant agents, the core of the economy coincides with the perfectly competitive outcomes, which in the case of differentiable preferences is a unique element that is the Aumann–Shapley value. Another major contribution of Neyman was the introduction of the Neyman value, a far-reaching generalization of the Aumann–Shapley value to the case of non-differentiable vector measure games.

=== Other ===
Neyman has made contributions to other fields of mathematics, usually motivated by problems in game theory. Among these contributions are a renewal theorem for sampling without replacement (mentioned above as applied to the theory of the value), contributions to embeddings of L^{p} spaces, contributions to the theory of vector measures, and to the theory of non-expansive mappings.

== Business involvements ==
Neyman previously served (2005–8) as director at Tradus (previously named QXL). He also held a directorship (2004–5) at Gilat Satellite Networks. In 1999, Neyman co-founded Bidorbuy, the first online auction company to operate in India and in South Africa, and serves as the chairman of the board. Since 2013, he has held a directorship at the Israeli bank Bank Mizrahi-Tefahot.
