= Ahi (political party) =

Ahi אח״י
- Leader: Eli Ben-Dahan
- Founded: 21 March 2005
- Split from: National Religious Party
- Ideology: Religious Zionism
- Political position: Right-wing
- Alliances: National Union (2005–2008); Likud (2009–2019); Yamina (2019, 2020)
- Most MKs: 2 (2005)
- Fewest MKs: 0 (2009)

Ahi (Hebrew: אח״י, lit. 'My Brother'), an acronym for Eretz Hevra Yahadut (Hebrew: ארץ חברה יהדות, lit. 'Land, Society, Judaism'), is a right-wing religious Zionist political party in Israel. Founded in 2005, it was part of the National Union alliance between 2006 and 2008. For the 2009 elections, it ran a joint list with Likud.

== History ==
The party was established on 21 March 2005, when Effi Eitam and Yitzhak Levi split from the National Religious Party during the 16th Knesset. The split resulted from opposition to Zevulun Orlev's faction in the party, after he had refused to resign from the government following its approval of the disengagement plan. The split occurred when Eitam was suspended as chairman of the party after it failed to approve his suggestion to unite with National Union in order to form a large right-wing–nationalist Religious Zionist party.

Eitam and Levi originally named their party the Religious Zionism (Hebrew: הציונות הדתית, HaTzionut HaDatit), but due to objections from the NRP that its name was too broad, a discussion at the party registrar resulted in the party being renamed the Connection Faction (Hebrew: סיעת התחברות, Siat Hitkhabrut). The party's final name listed in the party registry was the Renewed National Religious Zionist Party (Hebrew: מפלגת ציונות דתית לאומית מתחדשת, Miflaget Tzionut Datit Leumit Mithadeshet).

On 1 August 2005, the party joined the National Union alongside Tkuma and Moledet to participate in the 2006 election, and were joined at the last minute by the National Religious Party. The list won nine seats, of which the Renewed National Religious Zionist Party took two.

On 11 November 2007, the party was renamed Ahi. On 23 December 2008, it left the National Union. For the 2009 elections, the party ran a joint list with Likud, with Shalom Lerner taking the 39th place and Edmund Hasin taking the 45th. With Likud winning only 27 seats, neither Ahi candidate entered the Knesset.

The party's registration was maintained until 2019, when it was revived by Eli Ben-Dahan, after he left the Jewish Home, the successor to the National Religious Party. As part of an agreement with Likud, Ben-Dahan contested the April 2019 elections on the Likud list, but split from the party in June to sit as an Ahi MK.
