= National Religious Party =

Defunct political party in Israel

National Religious Party מפד״ל
- Leader: Haim-Moshe Shapira; Yosef Burg; Zevulun Hammer; Yitzhak Levy; Effi Eitam; Zevulun Orlev
- Founded: 1956
- Dissolved: 18 November 2008
- Merger of: Hapoel HaMizrachi and Mizrachi
- Merged into: The Jewish Home
- Headquarters: Jerusalem
- Newspaper: HaTzofe
- Ideology: Religious Zionism; Social conservatism Jewish Orthodox interests 1970s–2008: Settler interests Greater Israel
- Political position: 1956–1960s: Centre to centre-left 1970s–1980s: Centre-right to right-wing 1990s–2008: Right-wing to far-right
- Most MKs: 12
- Fewest MKs: 3 (2006)

Election symbol

Website
- mafdal.org.il

The National Religious Party (Hebrew: מִפְלָגָה דָּתִית לְאֻומִּית, Miflaga Datit Leumit), commonly known in Israel by its Hebrew abbreviation Mafdal (מפד״ל), was an Israeli political party representing the interests of the Israeli settlers and religious Zionist movement.

Formed in 1956, at the time of its dissolution in 2008, it was the second-oldest surviving party in the country after Agudat Yisrael, and was part of every government coalition until 1992. Originally a pragmatic centrist party in its first two decades of existence, it gradually leaned rightward in the following years, particularly becoming increasingly associated with Israeli settlers. Towards the end of its existence, it became part of a far-right political alliance centered around the National Union.

The 2006 elections saw the party slump to just three seats, the worst electoral performance in its history. In November 2008, party members voted to disband the party in order to join the new Jewish Home party created by a merger of the NRP and most of the National Union factions. However, most of the National Union left the merger shortly after its implementation.

== Ideological background ==
The religious Zionist movement is an Orthodox Jewish faction within the broader Zionist movement, combining a belief in the importance of establishing a Jewish state in the Land of Israel following a religious way of life, in contrast to both secular Zionists and ultra-Orthodox Jewry. The spiritual and ideological founder of the Religious Zionist movement was the Ashkenazi rabbi Abraham Isaac Kook, who urged young religious Jews to settle in Israel and called upon the secular Labor Zionists to pay more attention to Judaism. Rabbi Kook saw Zionism as part of a divine scheme that would result in resettling the Jewish people in the Holy Land, and, ultimately, the coming of the Jewish Messiah.

== History ==
=== Origins ===
The National Religious Party (NRP) was created by the merger of two parties – Mizrachi and Hapoel HaMizrachi – in 1956. The two parties had run for the 1955 election on a joint list under the name of the National Religious Front. Even after the formation of the NRP as a single party, its lists used the National Religious Front name up to the 1992 election, with the NRP's own name only debuting on the ballot in 1988. The founders of the party were Yosef Burg and Haim-Moshe Shapira (both from Hapoel HaMizrachi), who focused their activity mainly on the status of Judaism within the framework of Israeli society. Throughout the NRP's existence, it attempted to preserve the relevance of Judaism on issues such as Israeli personal status laws, education, culture, and municipal issues such as prohibitions on the selling of non-Kosher food (in prescribed areas, and occasionally, throughout a given municipality), and prohibiting transportation and public activities on Shabbat.

The NRP operated a trade union (under the same name as the old workers' party, Hapoel HaMizrachi), a newspaper (HaTzofe), and a youth movement (Bnei Akiva). Only the youth movement still exists today.

=== Post–Six-Day War ===
The seeds of change were sown in 1967, when Israel's victory in the Six-Day War spawned messianic trends among religious Israeli Jews that resulted in many members of the NRP moving further right. After Israel gained control of the West Bank and Gaza in 1967, Haim Moshe Shapira, the leader of the NRP and member of the Israel cabinet, believed that Israel should aggressively pursue peace talks with Arab states and supported immediate negotiations with Jordan over the status of holy sites in Jerusalem. However, the party became internally divided around the annexation of the occupied territories. Some factions favored withdrawing from the occupied territories in the event of a peace agreement, while others argued that it was a religious obligation to annex the territories.

Around 1969, a new generation arose in the NRP, led by Zevulun Hammer and Yehuda Ben-Meir, called "the youth", demanding that the party pay more attention to socio-economic issues in addition to its concerns about Judaism and the modern state.

From its inception, the NRP maintained an almost constant number of 12 members of the Israeli Knesset. In 1981, it shrank to 6 members. The reasons were diverse: an overall reduction in its natural voting population; the political moderation of many Orthodox Jews; its turn towards the right-wing; the growing importance of the right-left schism in Israeli politics; and the rise of Orthodox Sephardic parties such as Tami and later Shas.

The Gesher – Zionist Religious Center (Hebrew: גשר – מרכז ציוני דתי, Gesher – Merkaz Tzioni Dati) faction was formed on 29 May 1984, during the 10th Knesset, when two MKs, Yehuda Ben-Meir and Zevulun Hammer, broke away from the NRP. Both were prominent members of the party, with Hammer serving as Minister of Education, Culture and Sport and Ben-Meir being Deputy Minister of Foreign Affairs. The faction took the Gesher part of its name from the youth faction within the NRP. The faction did not last long, as the two returned to the NRP on 12 June. Ben-Meir later left the NRP again to be one of the founding members of the left-wing religious party Meimad, whilst Hammer went on to become leader of the NRP.

The party was unique in that it participated in all the governments of Israel until 1992. During this period, it was a centrist party, interested mainly in religious matters and impervious to the left–right divisions of the Israeli public. The long-time cooperation between the Israeli Labor Party and the NRP is sometimes referred to as the Historic League (הברית ההיסטורית).

=== 2003 government ===
The NRP was a member of the 2003 government led by Ariel Sharon, and had two ministers in the cabinet. Effi Eitam was the Minister of Housing, and Zevulun Orlev was the Minister of Labor and Welfare. Yitzhak Levy was a deputy minister responsible for the Ministry of Religious Affairs until it was dismantled.

The party helped form the previous government's coalition, together with the Likud, Shinui, and the National Union, which was based on the following principles:

- A hard-line policy against Palestinian terrorism and increasing use of the military for counter-terror operations.
- Supporting the Road Map for Peace, but with the reservation that the Palestinians should stop terrorism and elect a democratic prime minister.
- Supporting the Israeli West Bank barrier, on condition that it will include the major settlement blocks in the West Bank.
- Finding a solution for those people who cannot marry according to Jewish law by creating something similar to a civil marriage.
- Drafting Haredi men for military service.
- Retaining the Jewish character of the state of Israel.
- Obligating the Shinui party not to act unilaterally in matters of state and religion, and that they would discuss the issues with the NRP and reach a compromise.

The party subsequently left the government and went into opposition.

=== Disengagement plan ===
Sharon's disengagement plan caused great controversy within the party. Sharon dismissed two cabinet ministers from the National Union to achieve a majority for approving the plan in his government. The NRP declared that it was resisting the plan and any removal of Jews living in Gush Katif (in the Gaza Strip). The party, together with the Likud right-wing, failed to stop the disengagement plan.

Eventually, Effi Eitam and Yitzhak Levi resigned from the government. However, the four other Knesset Members of the NRP supported Orlev's stand that the party should remain in the coalition and thwart the disengagement plan from the inside.

The party's Knesset faction split into two:

1. The Opposition (Eitam and Rabbi Levi) – who had resisted Sharon's plan and saw themselves uncommitted to the coalition and government.
2. The Coalition (Orlev, Yahalom, Finkelstein) – had voted to stay in the coalition, but vowed to quit when a Jewish settlement was dismantled.
- Nisan Slomianski did not take a clear position, compromising between the two factions.

On 13 September 2004, the party's "center" (a forum of all party members with voting rights) voted on a choice between Effi Eitam's proposal of immediately resigning from the government and Zevulon Orlev's proposal to leave the government only when it approved an actual removal of settlements. Eitam and Orlev agreed that the center's decision would be binding. The center supported Orlev's proposal by 65%–35%. The proposal stated that the party would stay in the government on condition that the government would hold a general referendum (משאל עם, Meshal Am) regarding the removal of the Israeli settlements, which would require a special majority, before the issue could be brought to a decision in the Knesset. If such a referendum would not be held, or if the government would approve a de facto removal of Israeli settlements, the party would resign from the government.

It was decided that the NRP would resign from the government if:

- The government approved the dismantling of Israeli settlements.
- The Knesset passed laws of evacuation and compensation.
- The Labor Party joined the government and the coalition.
- A general referendum on the disengagement would not be held.

On 9 November 2004, after Ariel Sharon declined the NRP's demand to hold a national referendum regarding the disengagement, Zevulun Orlev and the party resigned from the coalition and the government, vowing to pursue general elections in an effort to replace Sharon with a right-wing prime minister. After their resignation, Sharon had a minority coalition of 56 Knesset members out of 120.

=== The split ===
On 14 February 2005, Eitam was suspended from the party chairmanship by the NRP's internal court, after he left the government against the center decision. Angered at the suspension, Eitam and Itzhak Levi announced that they had officially split from the NRP to form a new party, the Renewed Religious National Zionist Party (now renamed Ahi, on 23 February. The new party became part of the National Union, an alliance of Moledet and Tkuma - itself a former right-wing faction of the NRP. At the time, the National Union also included the Russian-secular Yisrael Beiteinu party, though they chose to run alone in the 2006 elections.

=== Alliance with the National Union ===
Due to their weakening, the NRP eventually decided to run on a joint list with the National Union for the 2006 election, which included Eitam and Levy on its list. The joint list went under the title of National Union – NRP (Hebrew: האיחוד הלאומי-מפדל, HaIhud HaLeumi – Mafdal) and won nine seats, of which the NRP were awarded three.

On 3 November 2008, the party announced a merger with the National Union, Tkuma, and Moledet to form a new right-wing party, later named The Jewish Home. Zevulun Orlev said it would be "unity by the Zionist religious camp. Anyone can submit his candidacy. There is no advantage whatsoever to current Knesset members." On 18 November, NRP members voted to disband the party to join the new right-wing party created by a merger of the NRP and most of the National Union factions.

== Ideology ==
=== Main principles ===
The NRP was a Zionist party and stated that Israel was a "Jewish democratic state". The party's stated main goals were to contribute as much as it could to the state of Israel, and to influence its character to be more Jewish, as well as fighting for the protection of Israel and maintaining Israel's security.

The core belief " the Land of Israel for the People of Israel according to the Torah of Israel" commits the NRP to doing everything possible to further the security and integrity of the Land of Israel. The NRP aspires to influence policy from "within the government", and thus continue to safeguard Eretz Israel.

Unlike the Kach party, the NRP did not promote the notion of Medinat Halacha (Halachic state), a theocracy run according to Jewish law. This idea was promoted by Meir Kahane. The party wanted to retain Israel's democratic chaos while improving the Israeli people. It aspired to encourage Jews to become better by acting as role models and teaching Judaism to other Israelis by example. The NRP demands that most Haredi men complete three years of mandatory military service.

The NRP emphasised national unity, and vowed to work as a bridge between the different parts of Israeli society.

Religious and secular, Sephardim and Askenazim, right and left, old-timers and new immigrants - we are all one people. The NRP works toward national unity, absorption of immigration, and bringing people together from all sectors of the population. Without hatred and coercion. Gently, pleasantly, and with a smile.

They called this principle Ahavat Israel (אהבת ישראל, "Love of Israel").

The party was the patron of most of the national religious schools (חינוך ממלכתי-דתי), which teach both Judaism and general mandatory educational subjects such as mathematics, English, literature, physics, biology, etc. It sponsored some pre-military schools that provide higher education to future IDF officers and commanders. Besides funding and patronizing national religious schools, it also supported Yeshiva schools and Beit Midrash schools, places dedicated solely to Torah study. They also ran Yeshivot Hesder, an idea developed by Rav Yehuda Amital in which religious soldiers combine combat military service with learning Torah. The Hesder program is typically five years.

The NRP actively promotes Torah in Israel and strengthens national religious institutions: Zionist rabbinical training institutes, Zionist Kollels, Yeshivot gevohot, Hesder Yeshivot, Yeshiva high schools, and more. The NRP encourages Zionist rabbis to take on active roles as teachers in Yeshivot, and as spiritual leaders in cities and neighborhoods.

The party believes that the land of Israel is holy and belongs to the Jews based on God's promise to Abraham, and later to Isaac and Jacob. They believe it is God's will to settle all the land of Israel and nurture it. This principle has great impact on NRP policy toward the West Bank and the Israeli–Palestinian conflict.

=== Religion and state ===
The NRP's policy was that Israel ought to retain its special Jewish character and retain a vague commitment to Judaism.

The party argued that affairs of personal status, (such as marriage, divorces, and burial), should be kept under the authority of Israel's rabbis (or other religious clerics for non-Jews).

The NRP claimed that the Jewish state shows respect for the Jewish religion by observing the Sabbath and serving Kosher food in its institutions and organizations (as it applies to the IDF, public transportation, the Israeli police, and governmental companies.)

The party, along with the other Orthodox political parties in Israel, wanted entrenchment into Israeli law so that converts to Judaism who wish to immigrate to Israel under the Law of Return can only be accepted if their conversions were conducted according to strict Orthodox standards. This was a controversial position, as some secular claim that it would undermine Israel's connections with worldwide, and especially American, Jews. (See Who is a Jew? for more information.)

Regarding conversions to Judaism performed within Israel, the NRP found itself on the same side of the debate as the secular, and opposed to the views of the Haredi parties, particularly Shas. The party advocated that the Israeli Chief Rabbinate must act to ease the procedures for anyone who wants to convert, following the Neeman Committee (ועדת נאמן) recommendations. It also called for the restoration of the nationality (לאום "Leom") clause on the Israeli identification card. Both issues are connected to public debates about Russian immigrants who are within the rubric not being Jews according to Jewish law.

The issue of conscripting yeshiva students was a sensitive issue in the party's rhetoric. Historically, the NRP initiated the regulations allowing yeshiva students to avoid military service, and supported that position over a long time. This came into conflict with the party's ideology and its supporters as the party moved towards the center, and as the number of such students rose sharply leading to allegations that many were not really students. In the 2000s, the NRP explicitly stated that participation in the Israeli army was a Mitzvah and a moral obligation, and stressed that its "finest youth... serve in the elite commando and combat units in the IDF".

=== The Israeli–Palestinian conflict and the settlements ===
The NRP's views on the Israeli–Palestinian conflict can be summarized as:

- There will only be one state between the Jordan River and the Mediterranean Sea—the State of Israel. No independent national Arab entity (such as a putative Palestinian state) will exist within these borders
- No part of Israel will be given over to a foreign government or authority.

However, the party did agree to giving the Palestinian Arabs self-governing autonomy, subject to Israel's authority only in matters of security and foreign affairs (such as in borders and diplomacy), without the dismantling of the Jewish settlements.

The NRP reacted to the Second Intifada by demanding a harsh military response by Israel to "root out the terror infrastructure". It also called for disbanding the Palestinian Authority and the deportation of the PLO back to Tunisia. The party believed that Israel could stop Palestinian violence through the use of military force.

The NRP used mostly religious discourse to justify these positions. They stressed that the West Bank were parts of the ancient kingdom of Israel and kingdom of Judah, and hence, rightfully belong to modern Israel. Furthermore, the party viewed the Jewish settlements as an upholding of the mitzvah of settling the land of Israel. Many of its supporters and parliament members were settlers.

=== Social issues and welfare ===
The NRP did not adhere to an economic ideology (such as Marxism or Capitalism). However, the party believed that Israeli society and the state of Israel should support the poor and the needy, derived from the 613 mitzvot of the Torah. The party's most notable figure in this respect was Zevulun Orlev, (who served as Minister of Labor and Social Welfare). However, this issue was not high on the party's agenda or rhetoric.

=== Criticism ===
Some critics of the NRP said that it was too focused on the Israeli settlements in the West Bank, and that they neglected other issues such as education, social responsibility, and Ahavat Israel ("Love of Israel" i. e., of other Jews).

Left-wing critics insisted that the party's stubbornness about keeping the settlements was an "obstacle to peace", while right-wing critics said the NRP did not pressure the Israeli government enough to use more military force against Palestinian terrorism.

Critics from religious parties such as Shas and Agudat Israel scorned the NRP for having been in the governing coalition with an ultra-secular party like Shinui (which was often described as "anti-religious"), and for not doing enough to keep the Jewish character of Israel; in one example, the party displayed little, if any, resistance or dismay, against former Internal Minister Avraham Poraz's decision not to enforce the prohibition of selling bread during Passover (when eating bread is a prohibition of Chametz according to Orthodox Judaism).

== Members and supporters ==
=== Supporters ===
NRP supporters were mainly Zionists, who are Orthodox Jews, in some ways Modern Orthodox.

Wherever you look, you see them. Members of the national religious community, with the knitted kippot on their heads. In academia, in economic life, in the educational system, in high tech, medicine, the courts, the IDF, even in the media. Each one of them doing their bit of "kiddush HaShem" (sanctifying God) in daily endeavors.

Male religious Zionists can be recognized by their colorful hand-knitted kippah (כיפה, yarmulka or "skull cap"), hence their nickname: הכיפות הסרוגות (Ha-Kippot Ha-Srugot, lit. "The Knitted Yarmulkas").

== Election results ==
| Election | Leader | Votes | % | Position | Seats | +/– | Outcome |
|---|---|---|---|---|---|---|---|
| 1955 (Note: As National Religious Front, a coalition of Hapoel HaMizrachi (9 seats) and Mizrachi (3 seats), merged as a single party in 1956.) | Haim-Moshe Shapira | 77,936 | 9.13 | 4th | 11 / 120 | ▲1 | Coalition |
| 1959 | Haim-Moshe Shapira | 95,581 | 9.86 | ▲3rd | 12 / 120 | ▲1 | Coalition |
| 1961 | Haim-Moshe Shapira | 98,786 | 9.81 | 4th | 12 / 120 | Steady | Coalition |
| 1965 | Haim-Moshe Shapira | 107,966 | 8.95 | ▲3rd | 11 / 120 | ▼1 | Coalition |
| 1969 | Haim-Moshe Shapira | 133,238 | 9.74 | 3rd | 12 / 120 | ▲1 | Coalition |
| 1973 | Yosef Burg | 130,349 | 8.32 | 3rd | 10 / 120 | ▼2 | Coalition (1974–1976) |
| 1973 | Yosef Burg | 130,349 | 8.32 | 3rd | 10 / 120 | ▼2 | Opposition (1976–1977) |
| 1977 | Yosef Burg | 160,787 | 9.20 | ▼4th | 12 / 120 | ▲2 | Coalition |
| 1981 | Yosef Burg | 92,232 | 4.80 | ▲3rd | 6 / 120 | ▼6 | Coalition |
| 1984 | Yosef Burg | 73,530 | 3.55 | ▼4th | 4 / 120 | ▼2 | Coalition |
| 1988 | Avner Hai Shaki | 89,720 | 3.93 | ▼6th | 5 / 120 | ▲1 | Coalition |
| 1992 | Zevulun Hammer | 129,663 | 4.95 | ▲5th | 6 / 120 | ▲1 | Opposition |
| 1996 | Zevulun Hammer | 240,271 | 7.87 | ▲4th | 9 / 120 | ▲3 | Coalition |
| 1999 | Yitzhak Levy | 140,307 | 4.24 | ▼8th | 5 / 120 | ▼4 | Coalition |
| 2003 | Effi Eitam | 132,370 | 4.20 | ▲7th | 6 / 120 | ▲1 | Coalition (2003–2004) |
| 2003 | Effi Eitam | 132,370 | 4.20 | ▲7th | 6 / 120 | ▲1 | Opposition (2004–2006) |
| 2006 | Zevulun Orlev | With National Union (Note: received 224,083 or 7.14%) | | | 3 / 120 | ▼3 | Opposition |

== See also ==
- Neo-Zionism
