= Repeated game =

Game that repeats a base game

In game theory, a repeated game (or iterated game) is an extensive form game that consists of a number of repetitions of some base game (called a stage game). The stage game is usually one of the well-studied 2-person games. Repeated games capture the idea that a player will have to take into account the impact of their current action on the future actions of other players; this impact is sometimes called their reputation. Single stage game or single shot game are names for non-repeated games.

== Example ==
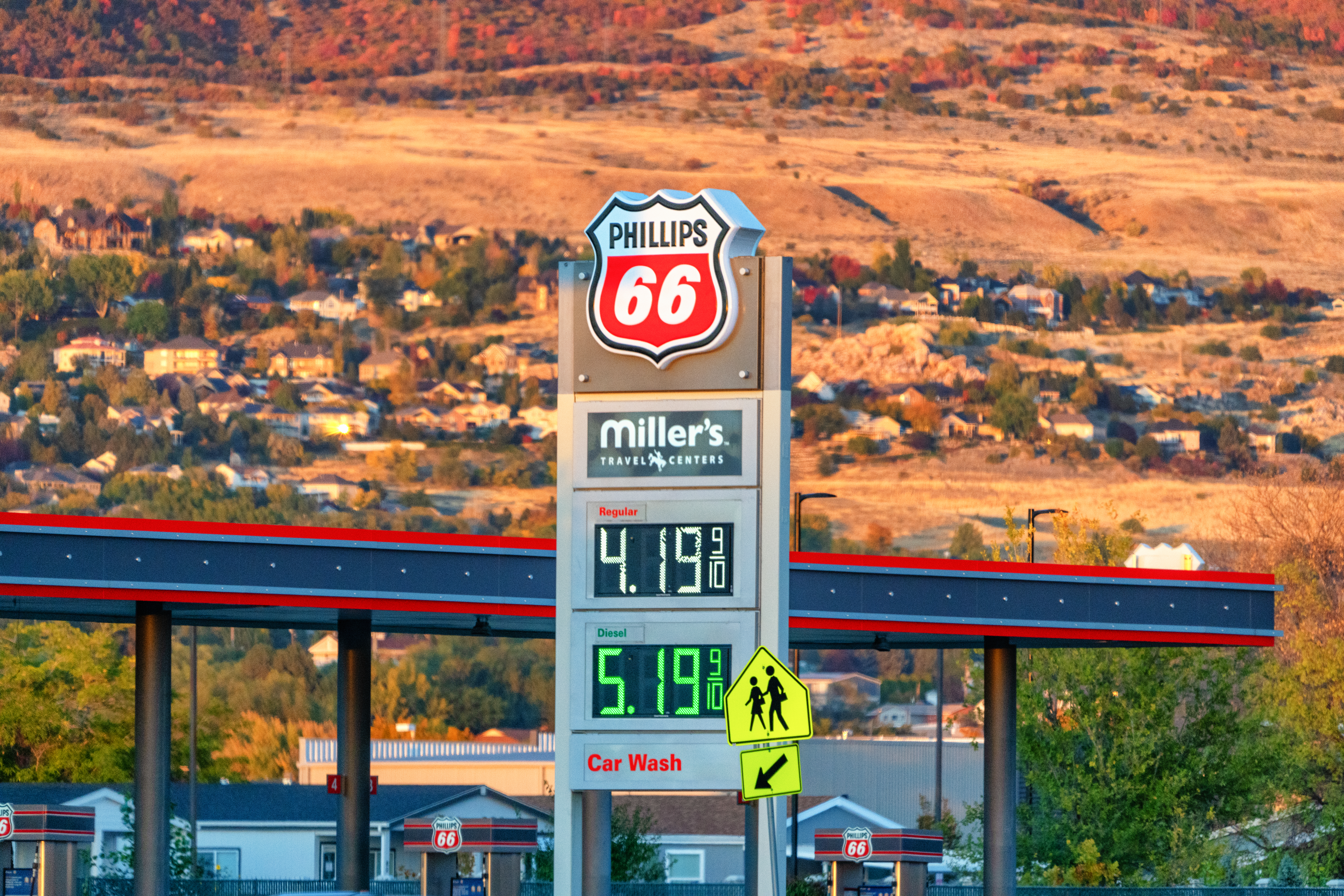
Prices at a gas station

Consider two gas stations that are adjacent to one another. They compete by publicly posting pricing, and have the same and constant marginal cost c (the wholesale price of gasoline). Assume that when they both charge p = 10, their joint profit is maximized, resulting in a high profit for everyone.

Despite the fact that this is the best outcome for them, they are motivated to deviate. By modestly lowering the price, either can steal all of their competitors' customers, nearly doubling their revenues. p = c, where their profit is zero, is the only price without this profit deviation. In other words, in the pricing competition game, the only Nash equilibrium is inefficient (for gas stations) that both charge p = c.

This is more of a rule than an exception: in a staged game, the Nash equilibrium is the only result that an agent can consistently acquire in an interaction, and it is usually inefficient for them. This is because the agents are just concerned with their own personal interests, and do not care about the benefits or costs that their actions bring to competitors. On the other hand, gas stations make a profit even if there is another gas station adjacent. One of the most crucial reasons is that their interaction is not one-off. This condition is portrayed by repeated games, in which two gas stations compete for pricing (stage games) across an indefinite time range t = 0, 1, 2,....

== Finitely vs infinitely repeated games ==
Repeated games may be broadly divided into two classes, finite and infinite, depending on how long the game is being played for.

- Finite games are those in which both players know that the game is being played a specific (and finite) number of rounds, and that the game ends for certain after that many rounds have been played. In general, finite games can be solved by backwards induction.
- Infinite games are those in which the game is being played an infinite number of times. A game with an infinite number of rounds is also equivalent (in terms of strategies to play) to a game in which the players in the game do not know for how many rounds the game is being played. Infinite games (or games that are being repeated an unknown number of times) cannot be solved by backwards induction as there is no "last round" to start the backwards induction from.

Even if the game being played in each round is identical, repeating that game a finite or an infinite number of times can, in general, lead to very different outcomes (equilibria), as well as very different optimal strategies.

== Infinitely repeated games ==
The most widely studied repeated games are games that are repeated an infinite number of times. In iterated prisoner's dilemma games, it is found that the preferred strategy is not to play a Nash strategy of the stage game, but to cooperate and play a socially optimum strategy. An essential part of strategies in infinitely repeated game is punishing players who deviate from this cooperative strategy. The punishment may be playing a strategy which leads to reduced payoff to both players for the rest of the game (called a trigger strategy). A player may normally choose to act selfishly to increase their own reward rather than play the socially optimum strategy. However, if it is known that the other player is following a trigger strategy, then the player expects to receive reduced payoffs in the future if they deviate at this stage. An effective trigger strategy ensures that cooperating has more utility to the player than acting selfishly now and facing the other player's punishment in the future.

There are many results in theorems which deal with how to achieve and maintain a socially optimal equilibrium in repeated games. These results are collectively called "Folk Theorems". An important feature of a repeated game is the way in which a player's preferences may be modelled. There are many different ways in which a preference relation may be modelled in an infinitely repeated game, but two key ones are :

- Limit of means - If the game results in a path of outcomes $x_t$ and player i has the basic-game utility function $u_i$, player i's utility is:

$$U_i = \lim_{T\to \infty} \inf \frac{1}{T} \sum_{t=0}^{T} u_i(x_t)$$

- Discounting - If player i's valuation of the game diminishes with time depending on a discount factor $\delta<1$, then player i's utility is:

$$U_i = \sum_{t \geq 0} \delta^t u_i(x_t)$$

For sufficiently patient players (e.g. those with high enough values of $\delta$), it can be proved that every strategy that has a payoff greater than the minmax payoff can be a Nash equilibrium - a very large set of strategies.

== Finitely repeated games ==
Repeated games allow for the study of the interaction between immediate gains and long-term incentives. A finitely repeated game is a game in which the same one-shot stage game is played repeatedly over a number of discrete time periods, or rounds. Each time period is indexed by 0 < t ≤ T where T is the total number of periods. A player's final payoff is the sum of their payoffs from each round.

For those repeated games with a fixed and known number of time periods, if the stage game has a unique Nash equilibrium, then the repeated game has a unique subgame perfect Nash equilibrium strategy profile of playing the stage game equilibrium in each round. This can be deduced through backward induction. The unique stage game Nash equilibrium must be played in the last round regardless of what happened in earlier rounds. Knowing this, players have no incentive to deviate from the unique stage game Nash equilibrium in the second-to-last round, and so on this logic is applied back to the first round of the game. This ‘unravelling’ of a game from its endpoint can be observed in the Chainstore paradox.

If the stage game has more than one Nash equilibrium, the repeated game may have multiple subgame perfect Nash equilibria. While a Nash equilibrium must be played in the last round, the presence of multiple equilibria introduces the possibility of reward and punishment strategies that can be used to support deviation from stage game Nash equilibria in earlier rounds.

Finitely repeated games with an unknown or indeterminate number of time periods, on the other hand, are regarded as if they were an infinitely repeated game. It is not possible to apply backward induction to these games.

== Examples of cooperation in finitely repeated games ==
	X	Y	Z
A	5 , 4	1, 1	2 , 5
B	1, 1	3 , 2	1, 1

Example 1: Two-Stage Repeated Game with Multiple Nash Equilibria

Example 1 shows a two-stage repeated game with multiple pure strategy Nash equilibria. Because these equilibria differ markedly in terms of payoffs for Player 2, Player 1 can propose a strategy over multiple stages of the game that incorporates the possibility for punishment or reward for Player 2. For example, Player 1 might propose that they play (A, X) in the first round. If Player 2 complies in round one, Player 1 will reward them by playing the equilibrium (A, Z) in round two, yielding a total payoff over two rounds of (7, 9).

If Player 2 deviates to (A, Z) in round one instead of playing the agreed-upon (A, X), Player 1 can threaten to punish them by playing the (B, Y) equilibrium in round two. This latter situation yields payoff (5, 7), leaving both players worse off.

In this way, the threat of punishment in a future round incentivizes a collaborative, non-equilibrium strategy in the first round. Because the final round of any finitely repeated game, by its very nature, removes the threat of future punishment, the optimal strategy in the last round will always be one of the game's equilibria. It is the payoff differential between equilibria in the game represented in Example 1 that makes a punishment/reward strategy viable (for more on the influence of punishment and reward on game strategy, see 'Public Goods Game with Punishment and for Reward').

	M	N	O
C	5 , 4	1, 1	0, 5
D	1, 1	3 , 2	1, 1

Example 2: Two-Stage Repeated Game with Unique Nash Equilibrium

Example 2 shows a two-stage repeated game with a unique Nash equilibrium. Because there is only one equilibrium here, there is no mechanism for either player to threaten punishment or promise reward in the game's second round. As such, the only strategy that can be supported as a subgame perfect Nash equilibrium is that of playing the game's unique Nash equilibrium strategy (D, N) every round. In this case, that means playing (D, N) each stage for two stages (n=2), but it would be true for any finite number of stages n. To interpret: this result means that the very presence of a known, finite time horizon sabotages cooperation in every single round of the game. Cooperation in iterated games is only possible when the number of rounds is infinite or unknown.

== Solving repeated games ==
In general, repeated games are easily solved using strategies provided by folk theorems. Complex repeated games can be solved using various techniques most of which rely heavily on linear algebra and the concepts expressed in fictitious play. It may be deducted that you can determine the characterization of equilibrium payoffs in infinitely repeated games. Through alternation between two payoffs, say a and f, the average payoff profile may be a weighted average between a and f.

== Incomplete information ==
Repeated games can include some incomplete information. Repeated games with incomplete information were pioneered by Aumann and Maschler. While it is easier to treat a situation where one player is informed and the other not, and when information received by each player is independent, it is possible to deal with zero-sum games with incomplete information on both sides and signals that are not independent.
