= Hardcore hip-hop =

Music genre

- Other names: Hardcore rap
- Stylistic origins: East Coast hip-hop; boom bap
- Cultural origins: Early 1980s, mainly in New York City and Philadelphia
- Derivative forms: Gangsta rap; horrorcore; road rap; mafioso rap; dirty rap; drill; trap; rage rap

Regional scenes
- West Coast hip-hop, East Coast hip-hop

Hardcore hip-hop (also known as hardcore rap) is a subgenre of hip-hop that developed through the East Coast hip-hop scene in the 1980s. Pioneered by such artists as Run-DMC, Schoolly D, Boogie Down Productions and Public Enemy, it is generally characterized by anger, aggression and confrontation.

== History ==
Music experts have credited Run-DMC as the first hardcore hip-hop group. Other early artists to adopt an aggressive style were Schoolly D in Philadelphia and Too $hort in Oakland. Before a formula for gangsta rap had developed, artists such as Boogie Down Productions and Ice-T wrote lyrics based on detailed observations of "street life", while the confrontational and aggressive lyrics and chaotic, rough production style of Public Enemy's records set new standards for hardcore hip-hop and hip-hop production. Though initially a largely East Coast phenomenon, by the late 1980s, hardcore rap increasingly became largely synonymous with West Coast gangsta rap, with artists such as N.W.A infusing "gangsta" themed stories of gritty gang life.

In the early 1990s, hardcore hip-hop again became associated with the East Coast as Wu-Tang Clan emerged with minimalistic beats and piano-driven sampling, which became widely popular among other hardcore hip-hop artists of the time. In the late '90s and early 2000s, other New York-based artists such as Onyx, DMX, and M.O.P. incorporated yelling in their lyrics. In the 2010s, punk rap combined elements of hardcore hip-hop and hardcore punk, with artists such as Denzel Curry at the forefront.

== Characteristics ==
Gangsta rap has often been associated with the hardcore hip-hop style, and gangsta rap is generally considered a subgenre or offshoot of hardcore hip-hop. However, not all hardcore hip-hop revolves around "gangsta" lyrical themes, despite the considerable overlap between the two genres, especially within hardcore rappers of the 1990s. Hardcore hip-hop is characterised by aggression and confrontation and generally describes violence or anger. Russell Potter wrote that while hardcore rap has been associated with a "monolithic 'gangsta' outlook" by the popular press, hardcore rappers have "laid claim to a wide variety of ground". Hardcore hip-hop can also be associated with progressive politics, with artists such as Public Enemy, KRS-One, Immortal Technique and Dead Prez, incorporating revolutionary lyrical content in a hardcore style.

== See also ==
- The Dozens
