= Confrontation =

Direct engagement of a dispute

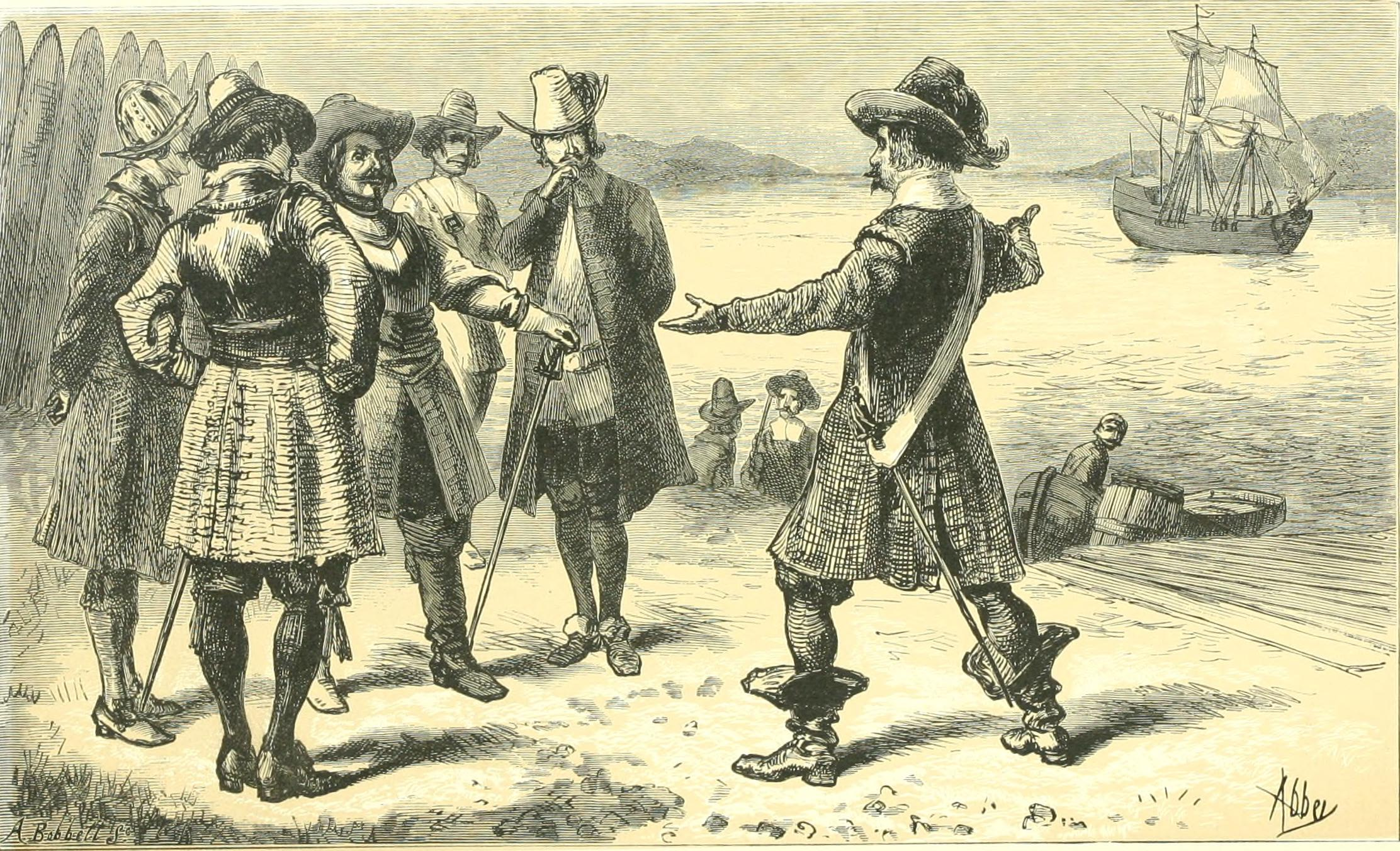
Illustration of a 17th century verbal confrontation between David Pieterszoon de Vries and Wouter van Twiller on the island of Manhattan. The two disagreed about the management of North American territories of the Netherlands.

Confrontation is an element of conflict wherein parties confront one another, directly engaging one another in the course of a dispute between them. A confrontation can be at any scale, between any number of people, between entire nations or cultures, or between living things other than humans. Metaphorically, a clash of forces of nature, or between one person and his own causes of internal turmoil, might be described as a confrontation.

It has been noted that the term confrontation has "a negative image, largely because people tend to confront others not about pleasant things but about painful, unpleasant things" and that it also "suffers from the stigma of being overly aggressive in both nature and intent". An examination of a hypothetical confrontation is the basis of confrontation analysis (also known as dilemma analysis), an operational analysis technique used to structure, understand and think through multi-party interactions such as negotiations. It is the underpinning mathematical basis of drama theory.

== Origin and meaning ==
The word confrontation from its root to confront, comes from the Middle French confronter and Medieval Latin confrontare, meaning to border or to bound. These in turn are formed from a combination of con, meaning with or together, and frons or front, meaning face or forehead. Together, they carry a contemporary usage meaning to set against each other or to bring face-to-face and are similar in meaning to the contemporary usage of the word conflict. (Note: Although conflict specifically derives from a meaning of strife or struggle by means of striking.)

It can be employed, in the most literal sense, to indicate adjacency, such as one parcel of land to another. In a more figurative sense, it may be more commonly used to indicate opposition, similar to some usages of the word face, such as "to confront/face the military might of France". This may be used to indicated both physical opposition, as well as opposition to objects or ideas, such as would be the case in "confronting the evidence" or "confronting the truth".

== Confrontation between groups ==
Confrontation may occur between individuals, or between larger groups. Because groups are composed of multiple individuals, with each member having their own specific triggers for a violent response to a perceived provocation, risk factors which "may not be sufficient individually to explain collective violence, in combination [can] create conditions that may precipitate aggressive confrontations between groups". Thus provocation of a single member of one group by a single member of the other group can lead to a confrontation between the groups as a whole.

== Responses to confrontation ==
A person who is confronted may respond in a number of ways, including accepting or denying points with which they have been confronted, becoming belligerent, or seeking to avoid the confrontation altogether. It has been observed that "[m]any people seem to dislike confrontations while an equal number seem to relish them". Confrontation, as a means of addressing a dispute, is the opposite of conflict avoidance. It has also been noted that "conflict and confrontation often occur together", and conflict resolution methods may dissipate the cause behind the confrontation. Where a person or entity initiating a confrontation is belligerent or overly emotional, the confronted person or entity may seek to withdraw from the situation by asserting that they will be unable to communicate rationally with the initiator until the initiator changes their approach.

== Psychology and therapy ==
George Devereux was among the first to explore the therapeutic function of confrontation as it relates to psychoanalysis. He described it as a form of "induc[ing] or forc[ing] the patient to pay attention to something he has just said or done." As Carlson and Slavik continue, this is for the purpose of revealing "new avenues for examination" and to "increase awareness". Devereux saw confrontation as a therapeutic application of "calling a spade a spade" by restating information already provided. As Jurgen Ruesch wrote, this incorporates an "element of aggression" in order to demonstrate "discrepancies between intent and effect, between word and action". This may be especially useful in cases when the patient is being deceptive, pretend to be ignorant, or is oblivious to their own inconsistencies. (Note: See also Berne, Eric (1966). Principles of group treatment. Oxford University Press. ISBN 978-0-19-501118-0.)

In psychotherapy, a therapist may deliberately engage in a confrontation with the patient to assist the patient in dealing with an issue that the patient has avoided discussing. Such a confrontation is not necessarily loud, abrasive, or argumentative, nor does it necessarily require antipathy between the parties. A person can confront another quietly, and as an act of friendship. At the extreme, attack therapy (sometimes known as confrontation therapy) involves highly confrontational interaction between the patient and a therapist, or between the patient and fellow patients during group therapy, in which the patient may be verbally abused, denounced, or humiliated by the therapist or other members of the group. A 1990 report by the Institute of Medicine on methods for treating alcohol problems suggested that the self-image of individuals should be assessed before they were assigned to undergo attack therapy; there was evidence that persons with a positive self-image may profit from the therapy, while people with a negative self-image would not profit, or might indeed be harmed.

== See also ==
- Conflict management
