= Drama theory =

Method of operations research

In operations research, drama theory is one of several problem structuring methods. It is based on game theory and adapts the use of games to complex organisational situations, accounting for emotional responses that can provoke irrational reactions and lead the players to redefine the game. In a drama, emotions trigger rationalizations that create changes in the game, and so change follows change until either all conflicts are resolved or action becomes necessary. The game as redefined is then played.

Drama theory was devised by professor Nigel Howard in the early 1990s and, since then, has been turned to defense, political, health, industrial relations and commercial applications. Drama theory is an extension of Howard's metagame analysis work developed at the University of Pennsylvania in the late 1960s, and presented formally in his book Paradoxes of Rationality, published by MIT Press. Metagame analysis was originally used to advise on the Strategic Arms Limitation Talks (SALT).

== Basics of drama theory ==
A drama unfolds through episodes in which characters interact. The episode is a period of preplay communication between characters who, after communicating, act as players in a game that is constructed through the dialogue between them. The action that follows the episode is the playing out of this game; it sets up the next episode. Most drama-theoretic terminology is derived from a theatrical model applied to real life interactions; thus, an episode goes through phases of scene-setting, build-up, climax and decision. This is followed by denouement, which is the action that sets up the next episode. The term drama theory and the use of theatrical terminology is justified by the fact that the theory applies to stage plays and fictional plots as well as to politics, war, business, personal and community relations, psychology, history and other kinds of human interaction. It was applied to help with the structuring of The Prisoner's Dilemma, a West End play by David Edgar about the problems of peace-keeping.

In the build-up phase of an episode, the characters exchange ideas and opinions in some form or another and try to advocate their preferred position – the game outcome that they are hoping to see realised. The position each character takes may be influenced by others' positions. Each character also presents a fallback or stated intention. This is the action (i.e., individual strategy) a character says it will implement if current positions and stated intentions do not change. Taken together, the stated intentions form what is called a threatened future if they contradict some character's position; if they do not – i.e., if they implement every position – they form what is called an agreement.

When it is common knowledge among the characters that positions and stated intentions are seen by their presenters as 'final', the build-up ends and the parties reach a moment of truth. Here they usually face dilemmas arising from the fact that their threats or promises are incredible or inadequate. Different dilemmas are possible depending on whether or not there is an agreement. If there is an agreement (i.e., stated intentions implement every position), the possible dilemmas resemble those found in the prisoner's dilemma game; they arise from characters distrusting each other's declared intention to implement the agreement. If there is no agreement, more dilemmas are possible, resembling those in the game of chicken; they arise from the fact that a character's threat or its determination to stick to its position and reject other positions may be incredible to another character.

Drama theory asserts that a character faced with a dilemma feels specific positive or negative emotions that it tries to rationalize by persuading itself and others that the game should be redefined in a way that eliminates the dilemma; for example, a character with an incredible threat makes it credible by becoming angry and finding reasons why it should prefer to carry out the threat; likewise, a character with an incredible promise feels positive emotion toward the other as it looks for reasons why it should prefer to carry its promise. Emotional tension leads to the climax, where characters redefine the moment of truth by finding rationalizations for changing positions, stated intentions, preferences, options or the set of characters. There is some experimental evidence to confirm this assertion of drama theory.

Six dilemmas (formerly called paradoxes) are defined, and it is proved that if none of them exist then the characters have an agreement that they fully trust each other to carry out. This is the fundamental theorem of drama theory. Until a resolution meeting these conditions is arrived at, the characters are under emotional pressure to rationalize redefinitions of the game that they will play. Redefinitions inspired by new dilemmas then follow each other until eventually, with or without a resolution, characters become players in the game they have defined for themselves. In game-theoretic terms, this is a game with a focal point – i.e., it is a game in which each player has stated its intention to implement a certain strategy. This strategy is its threat (part of the threatened future) if an agreement has not been reached, and its promise (part of the agreement), if an agreement has been reached. At this point, players (since they are playing a game) decide whether to believe each other, and so to predict what others will do in order to decide what to do themselves.

== Dilemmas defined in drama theory ==
The dilemmas that character A may face with respect to another character B at a moment of truth are as follows.

- A's cooperation dilemma: B does not believe A would carry out its actual or putative promise to implement B's position
- A's trust dilemma: A does not believe B would carry out its actual or putative promise to implement A's position
- A's persuasion (also known as "deterrence") dilemma: B certainly prefers the threatened future to A's position
- A's rejection (also known as "inducement") dilemma: A may prefer B's position to the threatened future
- A's threat dilemma: B does not believe A would carry out its threat not to implement B's position
- A's positioning dilemma: A prefers B's position to its own, but rejects it (usually because A considers B's position to be unrealistic)

== Relationship to game theory ==
Drama-theorists build and analyze models (called card tables or options boards) that are isomorphic to game models, but unlike game theorists and most other model-builders, do not do so with the aim of finding a 'solution'. Instead, the aim is to find the dilemmas facing characters and so help to predict how they will redefine the model itself – i.e., the game that will be played. Such prediction requires not only analysis of the model and its dilemmas, but also exploration of the reality outside the model; without this it is impossible to decide which ways of changing the model in order to eliminate dilemmas might be rationalized by the characters.

The relation between drama theory and game theory is complementary in nature. Game theory does not explain how the game that is played is arrived at – i.e., how players select a small number of players and strategies from the virtually infinite set they could select, and how they arrive at common knowledge about each other's selections and preferences for the resulting combinations of strategies. Drama theory tries to explain this, and also to explain how the focal point is arrived at for the game with a focal point that is finally played. However, drama theory does not explain how players will act when they finally have to play a particular game with a focal point, even though it has to make assumptions about this. This is what game theory tries to explain and predict.

== See also ==
- Confrontation analysis
