= Bandwidth-sharing game =

Type of resource allocation game

A bandwidth-sharing game is a type of resource allocation game designed to model the real-world allocation of bandwidth to many users in a network. The game is popular in game theory because the conclusions can be applied to real-life networks.

== The game ==
The game involves $n$ players. Each player $i$ has utility $U_i(x)$ for $x$ units of bandwidth. Player $i$ pays $w_i$ for $x$ units of bandwidth and receives net utility of $U_i(x)-w_i$. The total amount of bandwidth available is $B$.

Regarding $U_i(x)$, we assume

- $U_i(x)\ge0;$
- $U_i(x)$ is increasing and concave;
- $U(x)$ is continuous.

The game arises from trying to find a price $p$ so that every player individually optimizes their own welfare. This implies every player must individually find $\underset x{\operatorname{arg\,max}}\,U_i(x)-px$. Solving for the maximum yields $U_i^'(x)=p$.

== Problem ==
With this maximum condition, the game then becomes a matter of finding a price that satisfies an equilibrium. Such a price is called a market clearing price.

== Possible solution ==
A popular idea to find the price is a method called fair sharing. In this game, every player $i$ is asked for the amount they are willing to pay for the given resource denoted by $w_i$. The resource is then distributed in $x_i$ amounts by the formula $x_i=\frac{w_i B}{\sum_jw_j}$. This method yields an effective price $p=\frac{\sum_jw_j}{B}$. This price can proven to be market clearing; thus, the distribution $x_1,...,x_n$ is optimal. The proof is as so:

== Proof ==
We have $\underset{x_i}{\operatorname{arg\,max}}\,U_i(x_i)-w_i$ $= \underset{w_i}{\operatorname{arg\,max}}\,U_i\left(\frac{w_i B}{\sum_jw_j}\right)-w_i$. Hence,

$U^'_i\left(\frac{w_i B}{\sum_jw_j}\right)\left(\frac{B}{\sum_jw_j}-\frac{w_i B}{(\sum_jw_j)^2}\right)-1=0$

from which we conclude

$U^'_i(x_i)\left(\frac{1}{p}-\frac{1}{p} \left( \frac{x_i}{B}\right)\right)-1=0$

and thus $U^'_i(x_i)\left(1-\frac{x_i}{B}\right)=p.$

Comparing this result to the equilibrium condition above, we see that when $\frac{x_i}{B}$ is very small, the two conditions equal each other and thus, the fair sharing game is almost optimal.
