= Behavioral game theory =

Method of examining human decision-making

Behavioral game theory seeks to examine how people's strategic decision-making behavior is shaped by social preferences, social utility and other psychological factors. Behavioral game theory analyzes interactive strategic decisions and behavior using the methods of game theory, experimental economics, and experimental psychology. Experiments include testing deviations from typical simplifications of economic theory such as the independence axiom and neglect of altruism, fairness, and framing effects. As a research program, the subject is a development of the last three decades.

Traditional game theory is a critical principle of economic theory, and assumes that people's strategic decisions are shaped by rationality, selfishness and utility maximisation. It focuses on the mathematical structure of equilibria, and tends to use basic rational choice theory and utility maximization as the primary principles within economic models. At the same time rational choice theory is an ideal model that assumes that individuals will actively choose the option with the greatest benefit. The fact is that consumers have different preferences and rational choice theory is not accurate in its assumptions about consumer behavior. In contrast to traditional game theory, behavioral game theory examines how actual human behavior tends to deviate from standard predictions and models. In order to more accurately understand these deviations and determine the factors and conditions involved in strategic decision making, behavioral game theory aims to create new models that incorporate psychological principles. Studies of behavioral game theory demonstrate that choices are not always rational and do not always represent the utility maximizing choice.

Behavioral game theory largely utilizes empirical and theoretical research to understand human behavior. It also uses laboratory and field experiments, as well as modeling – both theoretical and computational. Recently, methods from machine learning have been applied in work at the intersection of economics, psychology, and computer science to improve both prediction and understanding of behavior in games.

== History ==
Behavioral game theory began with the work of Allais in 1953 and Ellsberg in 1961. They discovered the Allais paradox and the Ellsberg paradox, respectively. Both paradoxes show that choices made by participants in a game do not reflect the benefit they expect to receive from making those choices. In 1956, the work of Vernon Smith showed that economic markets could be examined experimentally rather than only theoretically, and reinforced the importance of rationality and self-interest within economic models. According to rational choice theory, consumers' behavior depends on three reasons. The first reason is that the degree of emotional pleasure consumers derive from their purchases depends on their preferences. The second reason is that consumers do not have enough choices. The third reason is that consumers derive greater pleasure from a limited number of choices. Later in the 1970s, economists Tversky and Kahneman, as well as several other co-workers, conducted experiments that discovered variations of traditional decision-making models such as regret theory, prospect theory, and hyperbolic discounting. These discoveries showed that decision makers consider many factors when making choices. For example, a person may seek to minimize the amount of regret they will feel after making a decision and weigh their options based on the amount of regret they anticipate from each. Due to the fact that these theories were not previously examined by traditional economic theory, factors such as regret along with many others fueled further research on the subject of social preferences and decision making.

Beginning in the 1980s experimenters started examining the conditions that cause divergence from rational choice. Ultimatum and bargaining games examined the effect of emotions on predictions of opponent behavior. One of the most well known examples of an ultimatum game is the television show Deal or No Deal in which participants must make decisions to sell or continue playing based on monetary ultimatums given to them by "the banker." These games also explored the effect of trust on decision-making outcomes and utility maximizing behavior. Common resource games were used to experimentally test how cooperation and social desirability affect subject's choices. A real-life example of a common resource game might be a party guest's decision to take from a food platter. The guest's decisions be affected by how hungry they are, how much of the shared resource (the food) is left and if the guest believes others would judge them for taking more. Experimenters believed that any behavior that did not maximize utility as the result of participant's flawed reasoning. By the turn of the century economists and psychologists expanded this research. Models based on the rational choice theory were adapted to reflect decision maker preferences and attempt to rationalize choices that did not maximize utility.

== Comparison to traditional game theory ==
There are various distinctions between traditional game theory and behavioral game theory. Traditional game theory uses theoretical and mathematical models to determine the most beneficial choice of all players in a game. Game theory uses rational choice theory to predict people's decisions in conditions of uncertainty. It understands strategic behavior to be influenced by utility-maximising preferences, as well as player's assumed knowledge of their opponents and material constraints. It also allows for players to predict their opponents' strategies. Also consumers' decisions are affected by psychological issues, and inattentional blindness is important in influencing the outcome of decisions. This is due to the fact that when consumers' attention is focused on one thing, they ignore other choices. Inattentional blindness believes that human attention and cognition are limited, which explains why consumers will make choices based on their personal preferences. Traditional game theory is a primarily normative theory as it seeks to pinpoint the decision that rational players should choose, but does not attempt to explain why that decision was made. Rationality is a primary assumption of game theory, so there are not explanations for different forms of rational decisions or irrational decisions.

In contrast to traditional game theory, behavioral game theory uses empirical models to explain how social preferences, such as ideals of fairness, efficiency or equity, influence human decisions and strategic reasoning. Behavioral game theory attempts to explain factors that influence real-world decisions. These factors are not explored in the area of traditional game theory, but can be postulated and observed using empirical data. Findings from behavioral game theory will tend to have higher external validity and can be better applied to real world decision-making behavior. Behavioral game theory is a primarily positive theory rather than a normative theory. A positive theory seeks to describe phenomena rather than prescribe a correct action. Positive theories must be testable and can be proven true or false. A normative theory is subjective and based on opinions. Because of this, normative theories cannot be proven true or false. Behavioral game theory attempts to explain decision making using experimental data. The theory allows for rational and irrational decisions because both are examined using real-life experiments in the form of simple games. Simple games are often used in behavioral game theory research as a way of analyzing unexplored phenomena, such as social preferences and social utility, that are not explored in traditional game theory.

== Examining social utility and preferences through games ==
Simple games are regularly utilized in behavioral game theory experiments in order to examine player's social utility. The simplicity of these games means that players do not face intellectual challenges, and player's choices are not impacted or altered by the game itself. This makes the games extremely useful in understanding social preferences. Games often include monetary rewards to easily calculate how players will act if their choices are driven by monetary incentives and payoffs. Player's actions are often shaped by the social utility function, whereby their choices are shaped by the benefits that both they and their opponent would receive. Traditional game theory would expect rational players to attempt to maximise their monetary rewards. If these calculations were wrong, however, and if players choose not to maximise their utility, then players would be exhibiting a social preference for a particular action. Behavioral game theory explains how players often deviate from traditional norms, and quite regularly consider factors such as social welfare when making their strategic decisions. For example, players are known to sacrifice high monetary rewards in order to maintain fairness within the game.

Different games demonstrate different social preferences. For example, the ultimatum game is known to demonstrate negative reciprocity. The premise of the ultimatum game is that Player 1 is given a certain amount of money, and is then forced to offer a certain amount to Player 2. Player 2 can then choose to either accept or reject Player 1's offer. If Player 2 accepts the offer, then both players are able to enjoy the amount offered. If Player 2 rejects the offer, then neither player is able to receive the money. Results from ultimatum game experiments demonstrate that players value being treated fairly and do not react well when one player is attempting to receive better payoffs than the other. Studies show that people are more likely sacrifice all monetary rewards if they are offered less than 20 percent of the original amount. This represents negative reciprocity preferences, as players would rather sacrifice their payoff in order to punish their opponent for their unkind behavior. However, being scared of having their offers rejected, people often give Player 2 around 40-50 percent of the original amount.

Another example of a social preference is positive reciprocity, which is displayed in the gift exchange game. The gift exchange game involves Player 1 either keeping set amount of money, or offering an even larger amount to Player 2. Player 2 is then able to decide how they wish to divide the money between the two of them. In this game, Player 1 trusts that Player 2 will return a certain amount of money to them. Findings from this game often show that if Player 2 is offered a generous amount of money from Player 1, then they are more likely to return the favour and give Player 1 back an equally generous amount. This demonstrates how players appreciate being treated kindly, and are more likely to treat their opponent kindly in return. The concept of positive reciprocity can be seen in real-life examples, such as the workplace. If an employer offers a large wage to their employees, then the employees often pay back the favour by working harder.

Altruism is another social preference seen in the dictator game. This game is similar to the ultimatum and gift exchange games. In this game, however, Player 1 is given an amount of money, and can then offer however much they would like to Player 2. Unlike the ultimatum game, Player 2 cannot reject the amount they have been offered. As a result, people are more likely to reduce the amount of money they offer to Player 2. Despite this, results show that people still offer Player 2 a sum of around 20-30 percent of the original amount. The dictator game shows how people are willing to share their rewards with people, despite not being forced to.

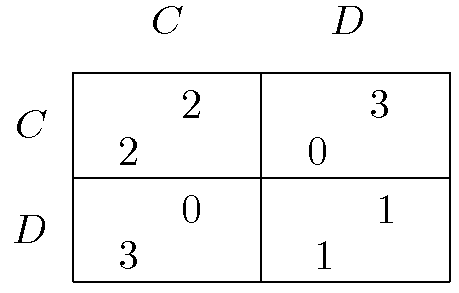
The Prisoner's Dilemma

The prisoner's dilemma game is effective in examining the social preference of cooperation. The logic behind the prisoner's dilemma is that every players rational choice is to defect, rather than cooperate. As it is in each player's best interest to defect, both players would rationally choose to defect. This results in a worse payoff for both players. The ultimatum game requires two players to agree on the allocation of money, yet what is reflected by the game is that humans are more concerned with whether the allocation is fair than whether the benefits are maximized. This behavior also illustrates that behavioral game theory is more well thought out than traditional game theory. However, in an attempt to reach a fair equilibrium for both players, results from the prisoner's dilemma game show that people cooperate much more than traditionally thought. When one player decides to cooperate, then the other players are more likely to cooperate too. This goes against the traditional beliefs that people only make decisions that maximise their utility.

== Examples of games used in behavioral game theory research ==
- Signaling game
- Dictator Game
- Ultimatum Game
- Keynesian beauty contest
- Normal form game
- Cooperative game
- Gift-exchange game
- Prisoner's Dilemma
- Zero-sum Games

== Factors that affect rationality in games ==
=== Learning ===
Learning models are a way of explaining and predicting strategic decisions in behavioral game theory. More specifically, they aim to explain how player's choices may change when given the chance to learn about their opponents or the game. There are three different types of learning models. The first is reinforcement learning. Reinforcement learning suggests that if a player received a high reward from choosing a certain behavior or strategy, then that player would be more inclined to use the same strategy again. If a particular strategy has not been used before however, then the strategy would not appear to be more or less appealing to the player. Another learning model is belief learning. Belief learning assumes that players often remember their opponents previous strategies in games, and will henceforth change their own strategies based on their opponents past behavior. Lastly, experience weighted attraction learning uses a mixture of belief learning and reinforcement learning in its model. This model accounts for the strategies and payoffs that have been played and unplayed. The experience weighted attraction learning framework posits that people learn from past experiences as well as by questioning what they could've done differently. Furthermore, it also believes that players evaluate their past rewards half as much as their actual rewards.

=== Beliefs ===
Beliefs about other people in a decision-making game are expected to influence ones ability to make rational choices. However, beliefs of others can also cause experimental results to deviate from equilibrium, utility-maximizing decisions. In an experiment by Costa-Gomez (2008) participants were questioned about their first order beliefs about their opponent's actions prior to completing a series of normal-form games with other participants. Participants complied with Nash Equilibrium only 35% of the time. Further, participants only stated beliefs that their opponents would comply with traditional game theory equilibrium 15% of the time. This means participants believed their opponents would be less rational than they really were. The results of this study show that participants do not choose the utility-maximizing action and they expect their opponents to do the same. Also, the results show that participants did not choose the utility-maximizing action that corresponded to their beliefs about their opponent's action. While participants may have believed their opponent was more likely to make a certain decision, they still made decisions as if their opponent was choosing randomly. Another study that examined participants from the TV show Deal or No Deal found divergence from rational choice. Participants were more likely to base their decisions on previous outcomes when progressing through the game. Risk aversion decreased when participants' expectations were not met within the game. For example, a subject that experienced a string of positive outcomes was less likely to accept the deal and end the game. The same was true for a subject that experienced primarily negative outcomes early in the game.

=== Social cooperation ===
Social behavior and cooperation with other participants are two factors that are not modeled in traditional game theory, but are often seen in an experimental setting. The evolution of social norms has been neglected in decision-making models, but these norms influence the ways in which real people interact with one another and make choices. One tendency is for a person to be a strong reciprocator. This type of person enters a game with the predisposition to cooperate with other players. They will increase their cooperation levels in response to cooperation from other players and decrease their cooperation levels, even at their own expense, to punish players who do not cooperate. This is not payoff-maximizing behavior, as a strong reciprocator is willing to reduce their payoff in order to encourage cooperation from others. Rational choice theory has limitations in interactive decision making, and it is also difficult to accurately predict human behavior in social cooperation. Behavioral games not only require players to make rational choices, but also require players to be able to predict the decisions of other players in their interactions. In game experiments, rational choice conflicts with individual decision making, and individual behavior may be able to achieve greater gains than rational choice. Rational choice theory has limitations and uncertainties for social interaction decisions, so the predicted results are not the same as the experimental results.

Dufwenberg and Kirchsteiger (2004) developed a model based on reciprocity called the sequential reciprocity equilibrium. This model adapts traditional game theory logic to the idea that players reciprocate actions in order to cooperate. The model had been used to more accurately predict experimental outcomes of classic games such as the prisoner's dilemma and the centipede game. Rabin (1993) also created a fairness equilibrium that measures altruism's effect on choices. He found that when a player is altruistic to another player the second player is more likely to reciprocate that altruism. This is due to the idea of fairness. Fairness equilibriums take the form of mutual maximum, where both players choose an outcome that benefits both of them the most, or mutual minimum, where both players choose an outcome that hurts both of them the most. These equilibriums are also Nash equilibriums, but they incorporate the willingness of participants to cooperate and play fair.

=== Incentives, consequences, and deception ===
The role of incentives and consequences in decision-making is interesting to behavioral game theorists because it affects rational behavior. Post (2008) analyzed Deal or no Deal contestant behavior in order to reach conclusions about decision-making when stakes are high. Studying the contestant's choices formed the conclusion that, in a sequential game with high stakes, decisions were based on previous outcomes rather than rationality. Players who face a succession of good outcomes, in this case they eliminate the low-value cases from play, or players who face a succession of poor outcomes become less risk averse. This means that players who are having exceptionally good or exceptionally bad outcomes are more likely to gamble and continue playing than average players. The lucky or unlucky players were willing to reject offers of over one hundred percent of the expected value of their case in order to continue playing. This shows a shift from risk avoiding behavior to risk seeking behavior. This study highlights behavioral biases that are not accounted for by traditional game theory. Riskier behavior in unlucky contestants can be attributed to the break-even effect, which states that gamblers will continue to make risky decisions in order to win back money. On the other hand, riskier behavior in lucky contestants can be explained by the house-money effect, which states that winning gamblers are more likely to make risky decisions because they perceive that they are not gambling with their own money. This analysis shows that incentives influence rational choice, especially when players make a series of decisions.

Incentives and consequences also play a large role in deception in games. Gneezy (2005) studied deception using a cheap talk sender-receiver game. In this type of game player one receives information about the payouts of option A and option B. Then, player one gives a recommendation to player two about which option to take. Player one can choose to deceive player two, and player two can choose to reject player one's advice. Gneezy found that participants were more sensitive to their gain from lying than to their opponent's loss. He also found that participants were not wholly selfish and cared about how much their opponents lost from their deception, but this effect diminished as their own payout increased. These findings show that decision makers examine both incentives to lie and consequences of lying in order to decide whether or not to lie. In general people are averse to lying, but given the right incentives they tend to ignore consequences. Wang (2009) also used a cheap talk game to study deception in participants with an incentive to deceive. Using eye tracking he found that participants who received information about payoffs focused on their own payoff twice as often as their opponents. This suggests minimal strategic thinking. Further, participants' pupils dilated when they sent a deceiving, and they dilated more when telling a bigger lie. Through these physical cues Wang concluded that deception is cognitively difficult. These findings show that factors such as incentives, consequences, and deception can create irrational decisions and affect the way games unfold.

A consequence of the game theory is its lack of use of empirical data to predict outcomes. "game theory will be no substitute for an empirically grounded behavioral theory when we want to predict what people will actually do in a competitive situation" Predicting rational behavior is possible with game theory but it can be improved if the theory is open to adjustment. The predicted result of the game can be improved and long-lasting if the discipline expands its knowledge of behavioral theory. How people act, think, and feel affect their decisions to play a role in this theory.,. Ken Binmore makes an excellent point that when empirically sound data is present, game theory should not hold the final decision outcome. That this is good for trying to understand if the rational decision being made is due to game theory or is just a consistent behavioral decision being made. The field of economics should try to take every step in improving empirical information in that there is little reliance on just a theory. Businesses value game theory, and the economic discipline must improve the strength of game theory by trying to establish an empirical database. Society will be able to advance its knowledge of behavioral game theory just by expanding the economic discipline of data. Alvin E Roth states, "if we do not take steps in the direction of adding a solid empirical base to game theory, but instead continue to rely on game theory primarily for conceptual insights, then it is likely that long before a hundred-year game theory will have experienced sharply diminishing return"

=== Group decisions ===
Behavioral game theory considers the effects of groups on rationality. In the real world many decisions are made by teams, yet traditional game theory uses an individual as a decision maker. Milton Friedman argues that usually people ignore individual behavior and focus more on group behavior, so group behavior is often perceived as more rational. This created a need to model group decision-making behavior. Bornstein and Yaniv (1998) examined the difference in rationality between groups and individuals in an ultimatum game. In this game player one (or group one) decides what percentage of a payout to give to player two (or group two) and then player two decides whether to accept or reject this offer. Participants in the group condition were put in groups of three and allowed to deliberate on their decisions. Perfect rationality in this game would be player one offering player two none of the payout, but that is almost never the case in observed offers. Bornstein and Yaniv found that groups were less generous, willing to give up a smaller portion of the payoff, in the player one condition and more accepting of low offers in the player two condition than individuals. These results suggest that groups are more rational than individuals.

Kocher and Sutter (2005) used a beauty contest game to study and compare individual and group behavior. A beauty contest game is one where all participants choose a number between zero and one hundred. The winner is the participant who chooses a number closest to two thirds of the average number. In the first round the rational choice would be thirty-three, as it is two thirds of the average number, fifty. Given an infinite number of rounds all participants should choose zero according to game theory. Kocher and Sutter found that groups did not perform more rationally than individuals in the first round of the game. However, groups performed more rationally than individuals in subsequent rounds. This shows that groups are able to learn the game and adapt their strategy faster than individuals.

== See also ==
- Behavioral economics
- Experimental economics
- Game theory
