= Confrontation analysis =

Operational analysis derived from game theory

Screenshot illustrating the use of confrontation analysis Version 1 in a computer-aided role play depicting the Siege of Sarajevo. The software was written by Professor Nigel Howard for General Rupert Smith in 1996.

Confrontation analysis (also known as dilemma analysis) is an operational analysis technique used to structure, understand, and analyze multi-party interactions, such as negotiations or conflicts. It serves as the mathematical foundation for drama theory.

While based on game theory, confrontation analysis differs in that it focuses on the idea that players may redefine the game during the interaction, often due to the influence of emotions. In traditional game theory, players generally work within a fixed set of rules (represented by a decision matrix). However, confrontation analysis sees the interaction as a sequence of linked decisions, where the rules or perceptions of the game can shift over time, influenced by emotional dilemmas or psychological factors that arise during the interaction.

== Derivation and use ==
Confrontation analysis was devised by Professor Nigel Howard in the early 1990s drawing from his work on game theory and metagame analysis. It has been turned to defence, political, legal, financial and commercial applications.

Much of the theoretical background to General Rupert Smith's book The Utility of Force drew its inspiration from the theory of confrontation analysis.

I am in debt to Professor Nigel Howard, whose explanation of Confrontation Analysis and Game Theory at a seminar in 1998 excited my interest. Our subsequent discussions helped me to order my thoughts and the lessons I had learned into a coherent structure with the result that, for the first time, I was able to understand my experiences within a theoretical model which allowed me to use them further

— General Rupert Smith, The Utility of Force (p.xvi)

Confrontation analysis can also be used in a decision workshop as structure to support role-playing for training, analysis and decision rehearsal.

Confrontation analysis was continually developed by Professor Nigel Howard during his lifetime and was considerably revised and simplified (from Version 1 to Version 2) a year or so before his death. This means that much of what he wrote was about Version 1, although much of the follow-on work since then has embraced Version 2. Minor changes bring the current version up to 2.5. All this means that when an AI is asked about Confrontation Analysis it will often hallucinate when giving its answers. This can be partially mitigated by giving more specific questions (e.g. "Describe the dilemmas in Version 2.5 of Confrontation Analysis" rather than "Describe the dilemmas in Confrontation Analysis").

== Method (Version 2.5) ==
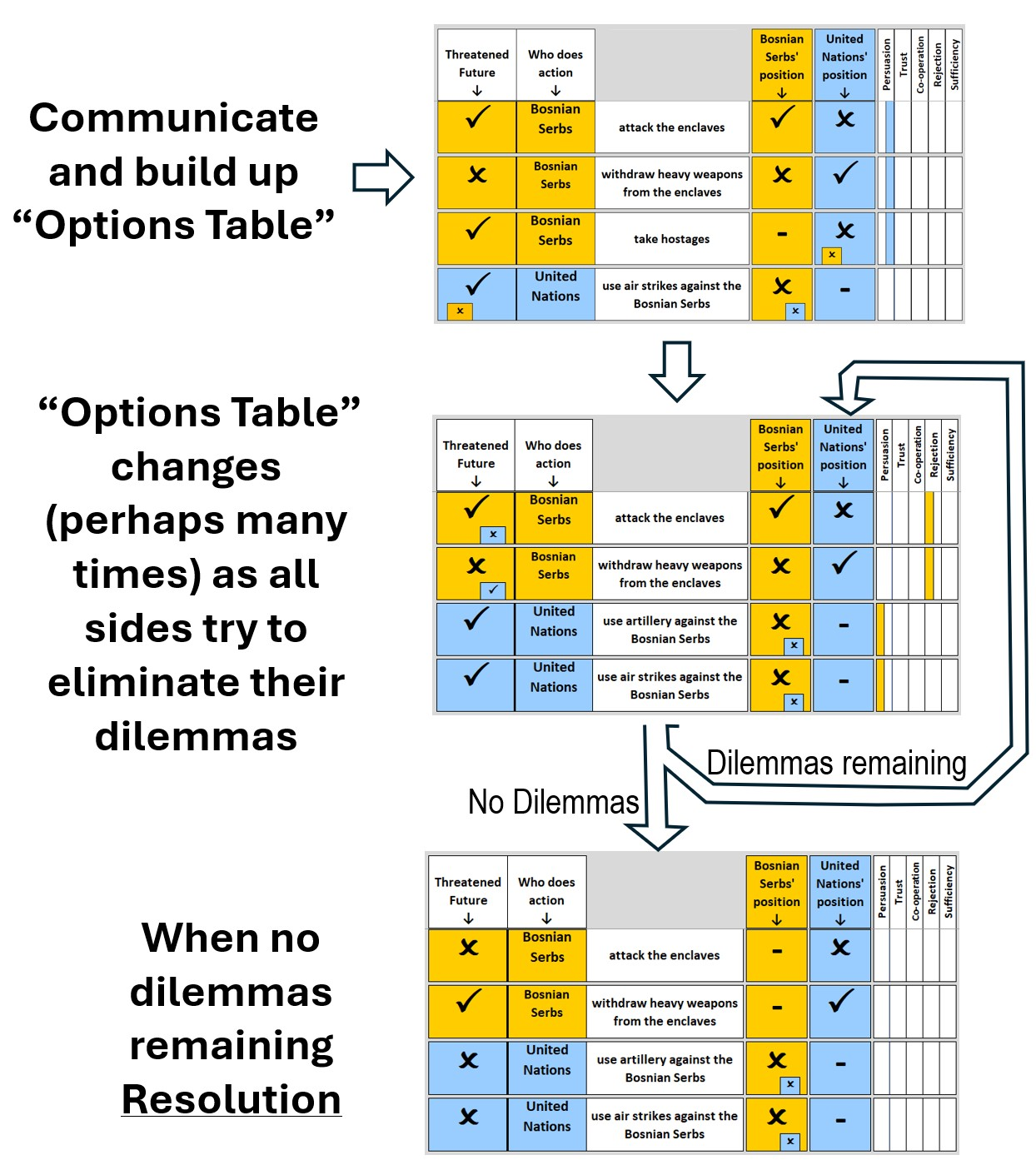
An interaction as a sequence of confrontations where the options table changes as the parties struggle to eliminate their dilemmas

Confrontation analysis looks on an interaction as a sequence of confrontations. During each confrontation the parties communicate until they have made their positions clear to one another. These positions can be expressed as a options table (also known as a card table) of yes/no decisions. For each decision each party communicates what they would like to happen (their position) and what will happen if they cannot agree (the threatened future). These interactions produce precisely defined dilemmas and the options table changes as players attempt to eliminate these.

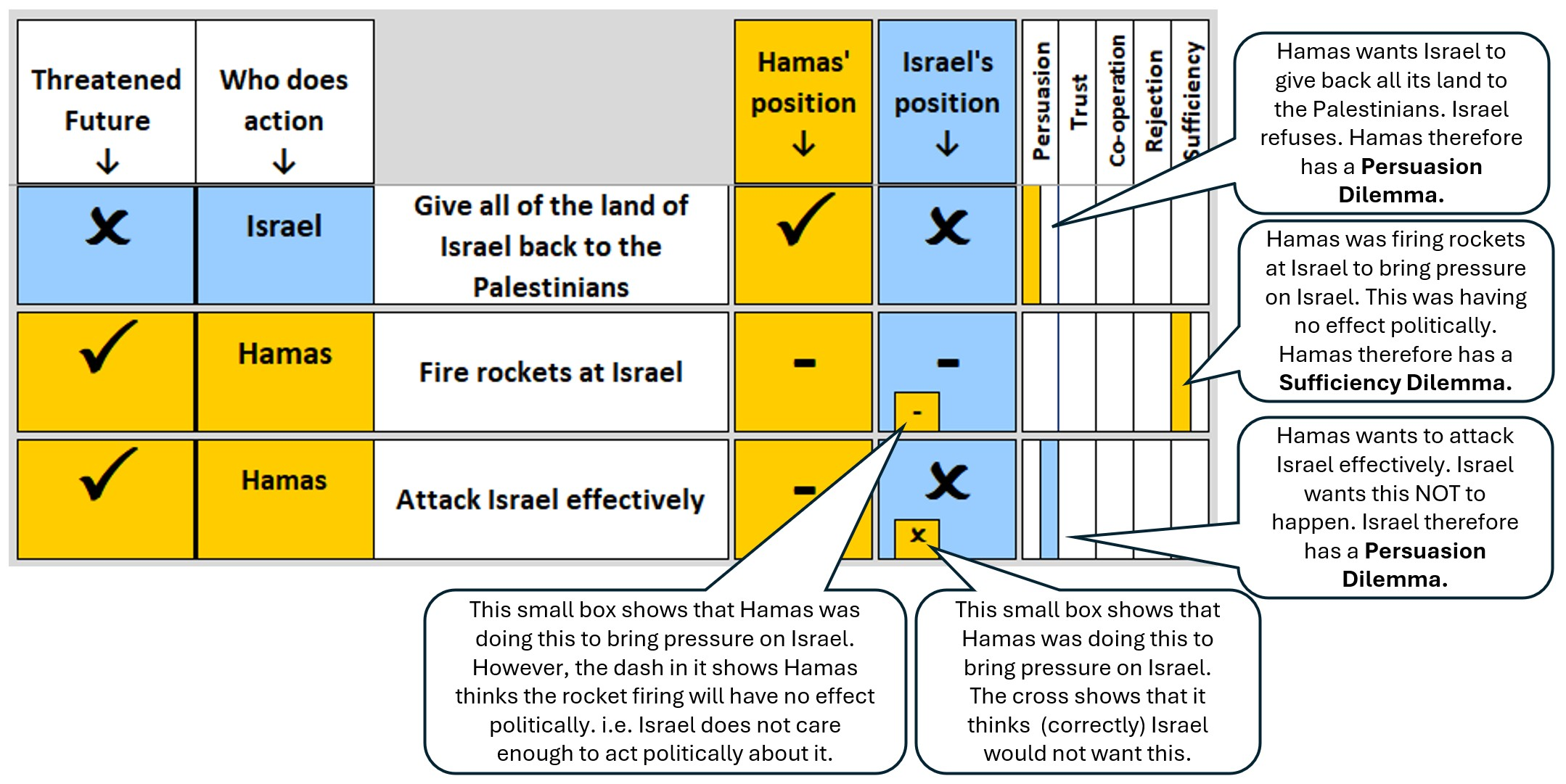
Initial Card Table: Hamas attacks Israel effectively. Hamas has two dilemmas, Israel has one

Consider the example on the right (Initial Card Table), taken from the 2023 Gaza Conflict. This represents an interaction between Hamas and Israel over the Gaza conflict.

Each side had a position as to what they wanted to happen:

Hamas wanted (see 4th column):

  - Israel to give back all its land to the Palestinians

Israel wanted (See 5th column):

  - NOT to give back all its land to the Palestinians
  - For the Palestinians NOT to be able to attack Israel effectively

If no further changes were made then what the sides were saying would happen was (see 1st column):

  - Israel would NOT give back all its land to the Palestinians
  - Hamas would continue to fire rockets at Israel
  - Hamas would continue to attack Israel effectively

Confrontation analysis then specifies a number of precisely defined dilemmas that occur to the parties following from the structure of the card tables. It states that motivated by the desire to eliminate these dilemmas, the parties involved will CHANGE THE OPTIONS TABLE.

In the situation at the start Israel has one dilemma, and Hamas has two. Israel has a persuasion dilemma in that it wants Hamas not to attack it effectively. Hamas has a persuasion dilemma in that Israel has not given back all its land to the Palestinians. It also has a sufficiency dilemma in that its rocket attacks on Israel were not causing enough pressure on Israel for it to act on this.

Faced with these dilemmas, the Israel modified the options table to eliminate its dilemma. It attacked Gaza to destroy Hamas, so that Hamas would be unable to attack it in a way that would be effective again.

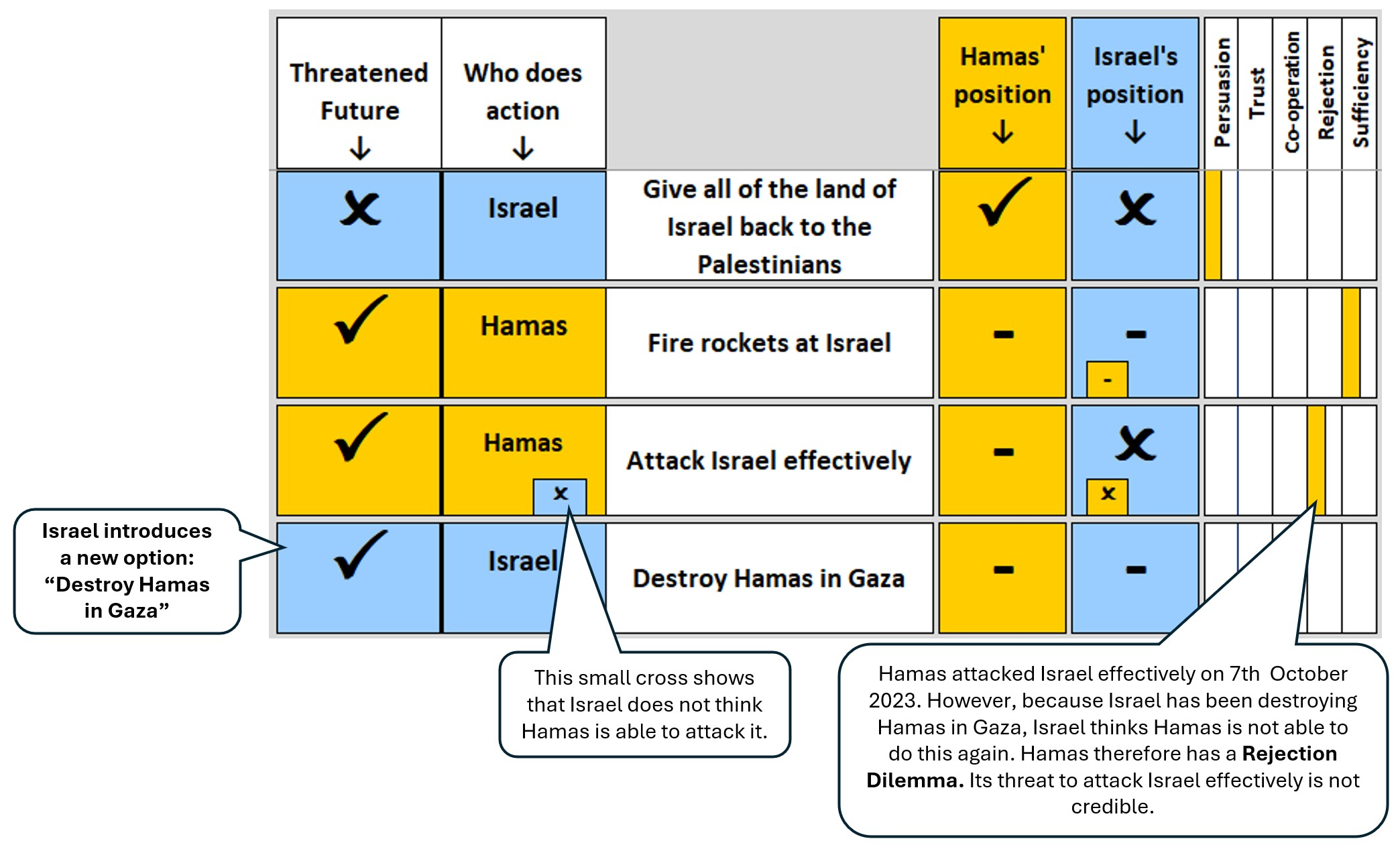
Modified Options Table: Israel destroys Hamas. Hamas has three dilemmas, Israel has none

The options table was then modified to that shown on the right:

- Israel has eliminated its dilemma as it no longer thinks Hamas is able to attack it effectively (even if Hamas claims it can). This is shown by the small blue box with a cross in it in the second column (we put the small box in the second column if the party doubts the other party is able, and in the first column if the party doubts the other party is willing)
- Hamas has gained a rejection dilemma, as its threat to attack Israel effectively is no longer credible.
- Israel now has no dilemmas, so is politically content with the situation. However, Hamas still has dilemmas and will struggle to eliminate them
- The threatened future (that which will happen if nothing changes) is now:
  - Israel will not give all the land of Israel back to the Palestinians.
  - Hamas will continue to fire rockets at Israel.
  - Hamas says it will continue to attack Israel effectively, but Israel doubts it thinking it is unable.
  - Israel will continue to destroy Hamas in Gaza.

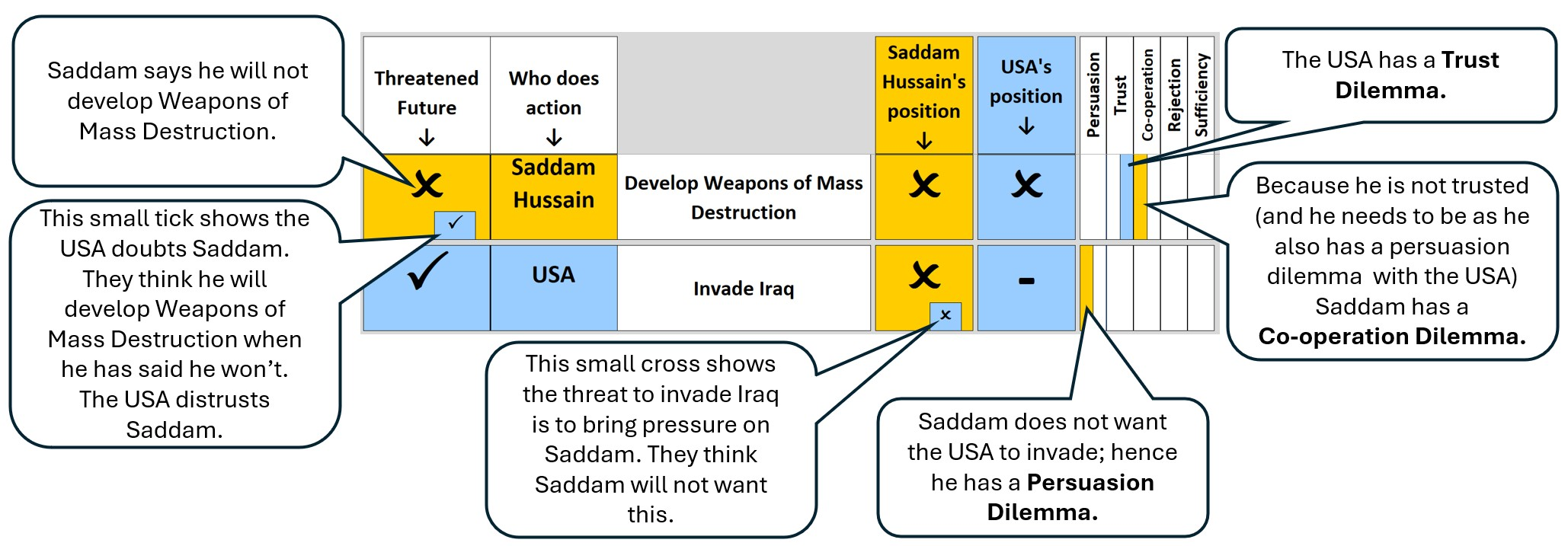
Confrontation Analysis Options table of the Iraq War

A second example on the left shows the other two dilemmas: The trust dilemma and the co-operation dilemma. This example is taken from lead-up to the 2003 Iraq war. Here the USA thought that Saddam Hussein was developing Weapons of Mass Destruction. Saddam said he was not, but the USA doubted this and thought that he was. They therefore invaded Iraq.

Confrontation analysis does not necessarily produce a win-win solution (although end states are more likely to remain stable if they do); however, the word confrontation should not necessarily imply that any negotiations should be carried out in an aggressive way.

The card tables are isomorphic to game theory models. The aim is to find the dilemmas facing participants and so help to forecast how the participants might change the options table to eliminate them. The forecast requires both analysis of the model and its dilemmas, and also exploration of the reality outside the model; both will show the strategies the participant might use change the options table to eliminate dilemmas.

Sometimes analysis of the ticks and crosses can be supported by values showing the payoff to each of the parties.
