= Rupert Smith =

British Army general (born 1943)

General Sir Rupert Smith KCB DSO & Bar OBE QGM
- Born: 13 December 1943 (age 82); Chelmsford, Essex, England
- Military career
- Allegiance: United Kingdom
- Branch: British Army
- Service years: 1962–2002
- Rank: General
- Service number: 477836
- Commands: Deputy Supreme Allied Commander Europe (1998–2001); HQ Northern Ireland (1996–1998); UN forces in Bosnia (1995); 1st Armoured Division (1990–1992)
- Conflicts: The Troubles; Gulf War; Bosnian War; Kosovo War; Operation Allied Force
- Awards: Knight Commander of the Order of the Bath; Companion of the Distinguished Service Order & Bar; Officer of the Order of the British Empire; Queen's Gallantry Medal; Legionnaire of the Legion of Merit (United States); Order of King Abdulaziz, 3rd Class (Saudi Arabia)
- Other work: Author

General Sir Rupert Anthony Smith, KCB, DSO & Bar, OBE, QGM (born 13 December 1943) is a retired British Army officer and author of The Utility of Force. He was a senior commander during the Gulf War, for which he was recognised with appointment as a Companion of the Distinguished Service Order (DSO), and again during the Bosnian War, for which he was recognised with the award of a bar to his DSO insignia. He later became Deputy Supreme Allied Commander Europe.

== Early life and education ==
Smith was born in Chelmsford, Essex, England on 13 December 1943, the son of Irving Smith and Joan Debenham. His father was a New Zealand fighter ace in the Battle of Britain who later led No. 487 Squadron RNZAF before rising to group captain in the service of the Royal Air Force.

Smith was educated at the Haileybury and Imperial Service College and later at the Royal Military Academy Sandhurst.

== Military career ==
Smith was admitted to the Royal Military Academy Sandhurst in 1962 and after graduating from a two-year course was commissioned as a second lieutenant into the Parachute Regiment in December 1964. He went on to serve in East and South Africa, Arabia, the Caribbean, Northern Ireland, Europe, and Malaysia. He was promoted lieutenant in June 1966, captain in December 1970, and major in December 1975. In 1978, when a major, he was awarded the Queen's Gallantry Medal for services in Northern Ireland.

In June 1980 Smith was promoted to lieutenant colonel. He was appointed an Officer of the Order of the British Empire in the 1982 New Year Honours, and in June 1985 was promoted to full colonel. His promotion to brigadier came in December 1986.

In October 1990, Smith was promoted major general and assumed command of the 1st Armoured Division which he led during the Gulf War. For services during the war he was appointed a Companion of the Distinguished Service Order (DSO), the United States Legion of Merit, and the Saudi Order of King Abdulaziz, 3rd Class. The citation for the DSO, published in the London Gazette reads:

Major General Smith has led the largest British armoured force deployed in action since World War II. He has done so with consummate skill and outstanding personal leadership and under direct enemy fire.

Within two weeks of taking over 1 Armoured Division in Germany, Major General Smith was despatched to the Gulf to command 35,000 men and women making up the British Ground Force contribution to Operation Granby. The force was made up of a wide variety of individuals, many never having served together before. He was given a two Brigade Division with exceptionally strong artillery and engineer support. Although he did not know it at the time, he had only six weeks to pull his force together, train it, and deploy it some 350 miles, and set up a close working relationship with the Americans under whose tactical control he was placed.

By the time the war started he had achieved all of these targets and had a first class fighting Division under his command.

During the land battle his Division was given a key role in the US VII Corps battle which involved a rapid exploitation of the minefield breach and a rapid advance to destroy some three Iraqi divisions. Failure to achieve it would have destroyed the main thrust of the Commander in Chiefs battle plan and could have resulted in grave and heavy US casualties.

With consummate personal attention to the detailed planning, and with outstanding personal leadership, Major General Smith swept his command through the breach and attacked the Iraqi division in detail. He personally led from the front with fearless disregard for the enemy anti tank fire, and despite the high threat of chemical weapons being used. With outstanding skill, and no little personal bravery, his Division achieved its objectives, secured the flank of VII Corps and enabled the main thrust of Desert Storm to sweep through and destroy the Iraqi rear divisions.

Major General Smith has led the major British land force operations on Operation Granby with a level of skill and personal bravery that is a credit to our nation.

He became the first Assistant Chief of Defence Operations and Security at the Ministry of Defence in August 1992. While there he was intimately involved in the United Kingdom's development of strategy in Bosnia-Herzegovina. In January 1995 he was granted the acting rank of lieutenant general and appointed Commander Bosnia and Herzegovina Command, to command UNPROFOR in Sarajevo. His lieutenant general rank was made substantive in April 1995, and he was awarded a Bar to his DSO insignia in 1996 for his services in Bosnia and Herzegovina. Knighted as a Knight Commander of the Order of the Bath in the 1996 New Year Honours, Smith was General Officer Commanding Northern Ireland from 1996 to 1998. His final assignment, initially as an acting general, was as Deputy Supreme Allied Commander Europe between 1998 and 2001, covering NATO's Operation Allied Force during the Kosovo war, and the development of the European Security and Defence Identity. His general's rank was made substantive on 1 January 1999. His retirement from the army took effect in January 2002.

He was appointed Honorary Colonel of Exeter University Officer Training Corps in June 2003 having held periods of tenure as Colonel Commandant Corps of Royal Electrical and Mechanical Engineers (November 1992 to November 1997) and Colonel Commandant the Parachute Regiment (July 1993 to September 1998). He also held the appointment of Aide-de-Camp General to Queen Elizabeth II between August 2000 and November 2001.

== Works ==
External videos
- After Words interview with Smith on The Utility of Force, May 10, 2008, C-SPAN

- The Utility of Force: The Art of War in the Modern World (Allen Lane, 2005) ISBN 0-7139-9836-9

A treatise on modern warfare, it explains why the best military forces in the world win their battles but lose the wars. This is due to the paradigm change in military activity, from industrial warfare to the paradigm identified in the book as "war amongst the people"—a situation in which an outcome cannot be resolved directly by military force. The strategies for war amongst the people should be analysed as fighting and winning a linked series of confrontations rather than a series of battles.

Military offices
Preceded by Roger Wheeler	General Officer Commanding 1st Armoured Division; 1990–1992	Succeeded by Iain Mackay-Dick
Preceded by Sir Roger Wheeler	General Officer Commanding the British Army in Northern Ireland; 1996–1998	Succeeded by Sir Hew Pike
Preceded by Sir Jeremy Mackenzie	Deputy Supreme Allied Commander Europe; 1998–2001	Succeeded by Dieter Stöckmann
