= Metagame analysis =

Problem solving as a strategic game

Metagame analysis involves framing a problem situation as a strategic game in which participants try to realise their objectives by means of the options available to them. The subsequent meta-analysis of this game gives insight in possible strategies and their outcome.

== Origin ==
Metagame theory was developed by Nigel Howard in the 1960s as a reconstruction of mathematical game theory on a non-quantitative basis, hoping that it would thereby make more practical and intuitive sense (Howard 1971, pp. xi). Metagame analysis reflects on a problem in terms of decision issues, and stakeholders who may exert different options to gain control over these issues. The analysis reveals what likely scenarios exist, and who has the power to control the course of events. The practical application of metagame theory is based on the analysis of options method, first applied to study problems like the strategic arms race and nuclear proliferation.

== Method ==
Metagame analysis proceeds in three phases: analysis of options, scenario development, and scenario analysis.

=== Analysis of options ===
The first phase of analysis of options consists of the following four steps:

1. Structure the problem by identifying the issues to be decided.
2. Identify the stakeholders who control the issues, either directly or indirectly.
3. Make an inventory of policy options by means of which the stakeholders control the issues.
4. Determine the dependencies between the policy options.

The dependencies between options should typically be formulated as "option X can only be implemented if option Y is also implemented", or "options Y and Z are mutually exclusive". The result is a metagame model, which can then be analysed in different ways.

=== Scenario development ===
The possible outcomes of the game, based on the combination of options, are called scenarios. In theory, a game with N stakeholders s_{1}, ..., s_{N} who have Oi options (i = 1, ..., N), there are O_{1}×...×O_{N} possible outcomes. As the number of stakeholders and the number of the options they have increase, the number of scenarios will increase steeply due to a combinatorial explosion. Conversely, the dependencies between options will reduce the number of scenarios, because they rule out those containing logically or physically impossible combinations of options.

If the set of feasible scenarios is too large to be analysed in full, some combinations may be eliminated because the analyst judges them to be not worth considering. When doing so, the analyst should take care to preserve these particular types of scenarios (Howard 1989, pp. 243 ff):

- The Status Quo, representing the future as it was previously expected.
- The present scenario, which may differ from the Status Quo as it incorporates the intentions that are expressed by the stakeholders to change their plans; the Status Quo necessarily remains the same, but the present scenario may change as stakeholders interact and influence each other's plans.
- The positions of different stakeholders, being the scenarios they would like others to agree to. Similar to the present scenario, positions may change through interaction.
- Compromises between two stakeholders, defined as scenarios that, while not the position of either, are preferred by both to the other's position. A compromise does not necessarily have to involve all stakeholders.
- Conflict points, defined as scenarios that stakeholders might move to in trying to force others to accept their positions.

=== Scenario analysis ===
The next step in the metagame analysis consists of the actual analysis of the scenarios generated so far. This analysis centres around stability and is broken down in the following four steps (Howard 1989, pp. 248–255):

1. Choose a particular scenario to analyse for stability. A scenario is stable if "each stakeholder expects to do its part and expects others to do theirs." Note that stable scenarios are accepted by all stakeholders, but that acceptance does not need to be voluntary. There may be more than one stable scenario, the stability of a scenario may change, and unstable scenarios can also happen.
2. Identify all unilateral improvements for stakeholders and subsets of stakeholders from the particular scenario. These are all the scenarios that are both preferred by all members of a certain subset and 'reachable' by them alone changing their selection of individual options.
3. Identify all sanctions that exist to deter the unilateral improvements. A sanction against an improvement is a possible reaction to an improvement by the stakeholders who were not involved in the improvement. It is such that the stakeholder who was involved in the improvement finds the sanction not preferred to the particular scenario, making it not worthwhile for that stakeholder to have helped with the improvement. The general "law of stability" to be used in scenario analysis is: for a scenario to be stable, it is necessary for each credible improvement to be deterred by a credible sanction (Howard 1989, pp. 251)
  Steps 1 to 3 need to be repeated to analyse some additional scenarios. When a number of scenarios have been analysed, one can proceed to the next step:
4. Draw a strategic map, laying out all the threats and promises stakeholders can make to try to stabilise the situation at scenarios they prefer. Strategic maps are diagrams in which scenarios are shown by balloons, with arrows from one balloon to another representing unilateral improvements. Dotted arrows from improvement arrows to balloons represent sanctions by which the improvements may be deterred, thus changing the destination of the improvement arrow.

This analysis procedure shows that the credibility of threats and promises (sanctions and improvements) is of importance in metagame analysis. A threat or promise, one that the stakeholder prefers to carry out for its own sake, is inherently credible. Sometimes a stakeholder may want to make credible an 'involuntary' threat or promise, to use this to move the situation in the desired direction. Such threats and promises can be made credible in three basic ways: preference change, irrationality, and deceit (Howard 1989, pp. 257).

== Development ==
Metagame analysis is still used as a technique in its own right. However it has been further developed in distinct ways as the basis of more recent approaches:

- the graph model
- confrontation analysis
