= Metagame =

Approach transcending a game's prescribed rules

A metagame, broadly defined as "a game beyond the game", typically refers to either of two concepts: a game which revolves around a core game; or the strategies and approaches to playing a game. A metagame can serve a broad range of purposes, and may be tied to the way a game relates to various aspects of life.

In competitive games, the metagame can refer to the most popular strategy, often called a game's meta, or preparation for a match in general.

In tabletop role-playing games, metagaming has been used to describe players discussing the game, sometimes simply rules discussions and other times causing the characters they control to act in ways they normally would not within the story.

== Etymology ==
The word metagame is composed of the Greek-derived prefix meta– (from μετά, meta, meaning "after") and the noun game. Metagame was used in the context of playing zero-sum games in a publication by the Mental Health Research Institute in 1956. It is alternately claimed that the first known use of the term was in Nigel Howard's book Paradoxes of Rationality: Theory of Metagames and Political Behavior published in 1971, where Howard used the term in his analysis of the Cold War political landscape using a variation of the Prisoner's Dilemma., however Howard used the term in Metagame Analysis in Political Problems published in 1966. In 1967, the word appeared in a study by Russell Lincoln Ackoff and in the Bulletin of the Operations Research Society of America.

== Casual gaming ==
In casual gaming, the metagame generally refers to any meaningful interaction between players and elements not directly part of the game. The concept gained traction in game design in a column written in 1995 by Richard Garfield, the creator of Magic: The Gathering, for The Duelist. In a 2000 talk at the Game Developers Conference, Garfield expanded on this, defining metagame as "how a game interfaces beyond itself", and asserted that this can include "what you bring to a game, what you take away from a game, what happens between games, [and] what happens during a game". Stephanie Boluk and Patrick Lemieux extend and refine Garfield's term to apply to potentially all forms of play and gaming, arguing that metagames are often more important than video games themselves. They go on to describe that metagaming "results from the entanglement of philosophical concepts, the craft of game design, and the cultures of play that surrounds videogames."

== Competitive gaming ==
In the world of competitive games, rule imprecisions and non-goal oriented play are not commonplace. As a result, the extent of metagaming narrows down mostly to studying strategies of top players and exploiting commonly used strategies for an advantage. Those may evolve as updates are released or new, better, strategies are discovered by top players. The opposite metagame of playing a relatively unknown strategy for surprisal is often called off-meta.

This usage is particularly common in games that have large, organized play systems or tournament circuits. Some examples of this kind of environment are tournament scenes for tabletop or computer collectible card games like Magic: The Gathering, tabletop war-gaming such as Warhammer 40,000, or team-based multiplayer online games such as Dota 2.

The metagame in these environments is often affected by new elements added by the game's developers and publishers, such as new card expansions in card games, or adjustments to character abilities in online games. The metagame may also come within player communities as reactions to win over currently-popular strategies, creating ebbs and flows of strategy types over time.

=== Metagaming and cheating ===
In competitive games, more pervasive forms of metagaming like teaming in free-for-all multiplayer games can be interpreted as cheating or as bad sportsmanship. Writer Richard Garfield's book, Lost in the Shuffle: Games Within Games, considers instead teaming as just a form of metagaming. The practice of losing individual games to dodge stronger opponents in tournaments has also been interpreted as a form of metagaming, sometimes considered as unfair.

=== In esports ===
Exploiting the meta is commonplace in esports. In StarCraft, a player's previous matches with the same opponent have given them insight into that player's play style and may cause them to make certain decisions which would otherwise seem inferior. Another instance of using the meta in esports was in 2012 at The International, a Dota 2 competition, when one team was able to exploit "predictable, economical strategies and that summer's metagame, the in-game decisions and team configurations that were fashionable" to counter a play by the other team.

In fighting games, the meta is also played through character selection. The opposing character has various strengths that can be avoided and weaknesses that can be exploited more easily depending on the character a player chooses, provided they are aware of those strengths and weaknesses (called a "match up"). For a basic example, a character with a projectile attack has the advantage over a grappler who must be close to the opponent to be effective. Match up metagaming is very important in tournament settings. In recent fighting games, blind select has been implemented for online modes. This makes it so that neither player can see what character the other player chose. In tournaments, players have the option to opt for a blind select where they tell a judge in confidence the character they intend to select in the match, making their character choice mandatory. A newer trend in more recently released titles is to allow the selection of multiple characters at once which the player can then switch between on the fly, rendering match-up picking excessively hard and virtually impractical.

=== In trading card games ===
In trading card games, players compete with decks they have created in advance and the meta consists of the deck types that are currently popular and expected to show up in large numbers in a tournament. The knowledge of metagame trends can give players an edge against other participants, both while they are playing by quickly recognizing what kind of deck opponents have and guessing their likely cards or moves, and during the deck building process, by selecting cards that do well against current popular deck types at the possible expense of performance against rarer ones. Another example of metagaming would be bluffing opponents into expecting cards that a player does not have, or surprising the competition with novel decks that they may not be prepared for. The secondary market of cards is heavily influenced by metagame trends: cards become more valuable when they are popular, often to the point of scarcity.

=== In roguelikes ===
Roguelikes often gate content behind completion of basic runs, usually to convey a sense of progression and/or not to inundate less experienced players with too many choices. This is usually referred to as the "metaprogression" of the game.

=== In chess ===
The chess metagame has developed over time to include particularly effective opening moves and reactions to them. However, since the game rules themselves are static, the metagame does not evolve in the same ways it does for games where the rules are regularly updated by developers.

As in other games, chess can also involve a metagame in which players use their knowledge of how the game is being played in a larger competitive context, beyond the rules of the game itself. Researchers identified a set of games in which players may have colluded in early rounds of chess tournaments to obfuscate player strength for a matchmaking advantage in later rounds.

== In tabletop games ==
In tabletop role-playing games, metagaming can refer to aspects of play that occur outside of a given game's fictional universe. In particular, metagaming often refers to having an in-game character act on knowledge that the player has access to, but the character should not. For example, having a character bring a mirror to defeat Medusa when they are unaware her gaze can petrify them, or being more cautious when the game is run by a merciless gamemaster.

Some consider metagaming to benefit oneself to be bad sportsmanship. It is frowned upon in many role-playing communities, as it upsets suspension of disbelief, and affects game balance. However, some narrativist indie role-playing games deliberately support metagaming and encourage shared storytelling among players.

== Game development ==
The metagame for game developers refers to the extra set of rules and logic that are independent of the core gameplay. This can involve extra progressions or an economic market appended to the core gameplay that add mid- and long-term goals for players. Some researchers argue that having a metagame for players can increase user engagement with those games.

== See also ==
- Bluff (poker)
- Calvinball
- Emergent gameplay
- Metagame analysis
- Mornington Crescent
- Nomic
- Pervasive game
- Poietic Generator
- Prisoner's dilemma
