= The Utility of Force =

Book on modern warfare by Rupert Smith

The Utility of Force: The Art of War in the Modern World
- Book cover
- Author: General Sir Rupert Smith
- Language: English
- Genre: Military history
- Publisher: Allen Lane
- Publication date: 2005
- Publication place: United Kingdom
- Pages: 428
- ISBN: 9780713998368

The Utility of Force: The Art of War in the Modern World is a treatise on modern warfare written by General Sir Rupert Smith and published in 2005. Smith is a retired general who spent 40 years in the British Army; he commanded the 1st Armoured Division in the First Gulf War and served as General Officer Commanding Northern Ireland at the end of the Troubles. He was motivated to write the book by his experiences in the Balkans. He commanded the United Nations Protection Force (UNPROFOR) in Bosnia from 1995 to 1996, during which the Srebrenica massacre occurred and the capital, Sarajevo, was under siege by Serb forces. Smith was instrumental in the lifting of the siege by arranging for NATO air strikes and an artillery barrage. This enabled a ground assault by Bosnian and Croatian forces that ended the siege and led to the Dayton Agreement. Smith's second involvement with the Balkans was in 1999 during the Kosovo War, when he was serving as NATO's Deputy Supreme Allied Commander Europe, overseeing air strikes against Serb targets.

Smith's thesis, and the central theme of The Utility of Force, is that the world entered a new paradigm of conflict at the end of the 20th and beginning of the 21st centuries, which he calls "war amongst the people", and that Western, industrialised armies are ill-suited to the new style of warfare. The defining characteristics of "war amongst the people" are that conflicts tend to be timeless, more political in nature, and fought between parties that are part of, and in amongst, the civilian population rather than between uniformed armies on a battlefield. To prove his theory, Smith provides a detailed history starting with Napoleon, who invented what Smith calls "industrial warfare"—the paradigm in which the entire resources of the nation were mustered and which culminated in the two world wars. In the second half of the book, Smith states that the advent of nuclear weapons rendered industrial warfare obsolete, but that Western governments and generals refused to acknowledge the new paradigm, which led to several significant defeats in the second half of the 20th century. He provides six themes which characterise modern conflicts and proceeds to analyse each in detail, before dedicating his final chapter to his reflections on his command in Bosnia. He concedes that he did not foresee the Srebrenica massacre, but criticises UNPROFOR, believing that it was not in a position to act even had the massacre been foreseen and that it had no strategy for effectively intervening in the war. In his conclusion, Smith argues that military force is only part of the solution in modern conflicts, and that it must be combined with political initiatives which together will subdue but not necessarily end the conflict.

The Utility of Force was broadly praised by reviewers on both sides of the Atlantic. It was compared favourably with Carl von Clausewitz's treatise On War and American reviewers felt that it contained important lessons for the United States military. Smith was criticised for over-emphasising the paradigm shift, with several reviewers observing that conventional wars are still fought and that the threat of such wars still exists, and for drawing too clear a distinction between "war amongst the people" and conventional war, particularly with his opening sentence "war no longer exists". Reviewers also felt that Smith under-emphasised the extent to which "war amongst the people" has always existed. Nonetheless, reviewers praised Smith's analysis of modern war and recommended that The Utility of Force ought to be read by politicians and military officers.

== Background ==
General Sir Rupert Smith is a retired career military officer who served in the British Army for 40 years. At the height of his career, Smith held several significant commands in both conventional conflicts and "wars amongst the people". As a major general, he commanded the 1st Armoured Division during the first Gulf War (1990–91). He went on to serve as Assistant Chief of the Defence Staff for operations and security from 1992 to 1995, during which time he came to the conclusion that military force could only achieve one of four things when used to intervene in a political conflict: "ameliorate, contain, deter or coerce, and destroy".

Smith's decision to write The Utility of Force was prompted by his experience in the Balkans. In late January 1995, Smith was appointed to command the United Nations Protection Force (UNPROFOR), sent to intervene in the Bosnian War. Smith was based in the Bosnian capital, Sarajevo, where he devised a strategy for the multi-national UN force that had been deployed effectively to carry out mainly humanitarian tasks but without a plan to bring the war to a successful conclusion. At the time of Smith's deployment, Sarajevo was in the middle of a siege, which Smith was instrumental in lifting after arranging for NATO air strikes and an artillery barrage against Serb forces commanded by Ratko Mladic. A ground campaign by Bosnian and Croatian forces eventually led to the Dayton Agreement, which brought the war to an end. It was also during Smith's command of UNPROFOR that the Srebrenica massacre—recognised by the International Criminal Tribunal for the Former Yugoslavia as an act of genocide—took place. Historian Niall Ferguson was adamant that Smith bore no responsibility for the events at Srebrenica and was indeed one of the few British officials "to emerge with distinction" from the intervention in Bosnia; nonetheless, Ferguson believed that the experience illuminates Smith's theoretical writings.

After UNPROFOR, Smith served as General Officer Commanding Northern Ireland from 1996 to 1998 towards the conclusion of the Troubles. In 1999, during the Kosovo War, Smith was NATO's Deputy Supreme Allied Commander Europe. NATO commenced air strikes against Serb forces led by Slobodan Milošević, again lacking defined objectives, while Smith worked to incorporate the bombing raids into an overall strategy.

== Narrative ==
=== Industrial war ===
The book opens with the statement that "war no longer exists"; that is, war as "battle in a field between men and machinery" or "a massive deciding event in a dispute in international affairs" is unlikely to happen again. The premise of the book is that the world is experiencing a new paradigm of war in the late 20th and early 21st centuries, which Smith dubs "war amongst the people", in which nebulous, open-ended conflicts have become the norm. Smith believes that Western, industrialised armies struggle to win in "wars amongst the people" because their opponents are not uniformed armies. He uses the term "rhizomatic" to describe terrorist and guerrilla movements; he states his belief that such fighters can adapt much more easily than state institutions, and that they exhibit a greater understanding of the utility of force. Rather than being part of a recognisable army, the fighters are part of the civilian population, and their objectives are more political than military—they seek to "win hearts and minds" rather than take or hold territory. As a consequence, wars are no longer confined to a battlefield, but the theatre of operations is fluid, and commanders now operate inside the theatre.

To prove his theory, Smith provides a detailed history of modern warfare, using examples from history to illustrate his contentions. Throughout the book, Smith analyses the use of force in each of the examples, and how it was used to achieve particular aims. The discussion of history begins with Napoleon, who invented the paradigm of industrial warfare. Prior to Napoleon, wars were mostly fought for territory rather than ideology, and did not substantially alter the balance of power between nations. Napoleon's concept of war involved using the entire resources of the nation with the aim of comprehensively defeating his opponent and replacing the political order; in order to meet the new challenge, the Prussian Army undertook sweeping reforms. Napoleon's strategy and the Prussian response influenced Prussian general Carl von Clausewitz in writing his treatise On War (published posthumously in 1832). Throughout the narrative, Smith analyses how armies applied force in order to achieve their objectives. He also discusses the emergence of guerrilla forces during the Peninsular War, which Smith believes was the first "war amongst the people"—irregular forces with no clear leadership structure conducting hit-and-run attacks on Napoleon's forces, fighting to preserve the ideology of Spanish independence rather than for a battlefield victory. The concept of industrial war culminated in the early 20th century with the two world wars.

=== War amongst the people ===
In the second half of the book, Smith states that the advent of the atomic bomb rendered industrial warfare obsolete, but that governments clung to the concept throughout the Cold War era—the Cold War itself being the last act of the old-style industrial war. The belief in industrial war tactics and institutions continued into the post–Cold War era, and Smith believes that political and military leaders refused to acknowledge the new paradigm of "war amongst the people", which resulted in significant defeats, such as for France in Algeria, the United States in Vietnam, and the Soviet Union in Afghanistan, and caused problems for NATO operations in the Balkans, and later for the Western coalitions in Iraq and Afghanistan. Smith also notes that, in the new paradigm, soldiers are frequently being asked to undertake new tasks—such as humanitarian operations—while still equipped and trained for old-paradigm conflicts between massed armies.

In the final third of the book, Smith uses six themes to describe the new paradigm of war:

- The ends for which we fight are changing from the hard objectives that decide a political outcome to those of establishing conditions in which the outcome may be decided
- We fight amongst the people, not on the battlefield
- Our conflicts tend to be timeless, even unending
- We fight so as to preserve the force rather than risking all to gain the objective
- On each occasion new uses are found for old weapons and organizations which are the products of industrial war
- The sides are mostly non-state, comprising some form of multinational grouping against some non-state party or parties.

Smith then proceeds to discuss each of the six themes in detail. Smith discusses modern guerrilla and insurgency campaigns, including various civil wars and ethnic conflicts in the Balkans, the Middle East, and Africa. The conflicts he discusses in the second half are almost all "wars amongst the people" and appear intractable to conventional forces. Smith analyses situations in which countries have adapted their tactics in order to respond to "war amongst the people", such as those used by Israeli forces in response to the Palestinian Intifada, in which the Israelis resorted to targeted searches when superior firepower proved ineffective. He points out that modern wars are rarely fought between individual nations, but the parties often consist of supranational coalitions or sub-state entities, and that Western governments in particular fight in such a way as to keep casualties and material losses to a minimum. Smith is critical of the conduct of the American-led coalition in the Iraq War during the insurgency which followed the initial invasion and occupation of Iraq in 2003; he opines that the soldiers undertaking the counter-insurgency operations did not have the proper skills or equipment for the task. He believes that the commanders were working at a tactical rather than a strategic level, and that operations were not sufficiently guided by intelligence—relying too heavily on battlefield strength and assessments of the insurgents' technical capabilities, rather than their political objectives.

Smith includes various anecdotes and personal reflections from his own career, and the final chapter of the book is dedicated to Smith's reflections on his command of UNPROFOR in Bosnia. Ferguson describes Smith as "candid" in admitting that he did not foresee the events at Srebenica in the summer of 1995, but Smith suggests that, even had the genocide been foreseen, UNPROFOR was not in any position to prevent it. He described the force as "reinforced camps of international troops attempting to defend the delivery of humanitarian aid, and often themselves". Smith's belief was that none of the governments that contributed soldiers to UNPROFOR had any intention of committing them to fight—that they had decided "to deploy forces with no intention to employ their force", having been scared into inaction by inaccurate reporting and a lack of understanding of the war.

In his conclusion, Smith states his belief that modern politicians and military leaders use force where it has no utility and commit military forces without fully defined political and strategic objectives. He believes that politicians and generals remain in the mindset of industrial war, which leads them to prepare for a decisive confrontation that never happens, and he condemns them for failing to recognise the shift in the way wars are fought. Discussing humanitarian interventions, such as those in the Balkans, Smith does not argue against intervention, but believes that the intervention must be based on a full understanding of the conflict and a clear strategy with defined objectives. According to Smith, "no act of force will ever be decisive" because the aim of modern conflicts is to win the will of the people, which will not be achieved by battlefield victory alone. He argues that whereas, in the industrial war paradigm, war led to victory and thus to peace, in the modern paradigm confrontation leads to conflict, which then reverts to confrontation. He asserts that force is only part of the solution to modern conflicts; they require complex political and military solutions, which will subdue but not necessarily permanently end the conflict.

== Release and critical reception ==
The Utility of Force was published in November 2005 by Allen Lane, an imprint of Penguin Books.

William Grimes, writing in the New York Times, described The Utility of Force as "a closely argued, searching textbook on strategy and the efficient use of military power in the post–Cold War era". Grimes also described it as a "difficult, challenging book", saying "you can almost hear the pointer hit the blackboard as he works his way rigorously through each argument and sub-arguments A, B and C, before proceeding to the next step. At times the history lecture becomes a forced march over very familiar terrain, but patient readers will discover that there is indeed a final destination". In a second review for the New York Times in 2007, Niall Ferguson, a history professor at Harvard University, described The Utility of Force as an update of Clausewitz's On War "for our times". Ferguson went on to criticise Smith for drawing too clear a distinction between "war amongst the people" and "war between peoples", pointing out that in several conflicts there was no single, homogeneous "people" and that wars amongst the people can easily transform into wars between people, citing Bosnia as an example. Ferguson was underwhelmed by Smith's recommendations for the future—Smith believes that new equipment and strategies are required in order for armies to be effective in the new paradigm, but does not offer any suggestions. Ferguson's final criticism was what he described as the book's "limited historical perspective"; Smith argues that "war amongst the people" emerged in the second half of the 20th century during the proxy wars and de-colonisation campaigns of the Cold War era, but Ferguson gave examples of similar campaigns which pre-dated the Cold War, including the First Boer War (1880–81) and campaigns fought in Eastern Europe during the Second World War. Nonetheless, Ferguson concludes that The Utility of Force is "an impressive and absorbing work", and described Smith as "the Clausewitz of low-intensity conflict and peacekeeping operations".

Academic Eliot A. Cohen, professor of strategic studies at Johns Hopkins University wrote for The Washington Post that the British Army had "a higher quotient of sophisticated leaders who have thought hard about the profession of arms" than was found in other armed forces, including the US military, which he believed explained why it "produces generals who write [...] serious, important books" such as the Utility of Force. Cohen wrote that Smith's thesis, that the world has entered a new era of conflict, is of "central importance" for the United States military, which Cohen believed would have to undergo significant adaptation if Smith was correct. Cohen criticised the book for its limited historical perspective, noting that conventional wars are still fought (for example the Kargil War in 1999) and that several confrontations in Asia threatened to spill over into conventional warfare. Nevertheless, Cohen concluded "Smith has clearly written one of the most important books on modern warfare in the last decade. We would be better off if the United States had a few more generals like him".

The Guardian's Martin Woollacott reviewed the book along with sociologist Martin Shaw's The New Western Way of War: Risk-Transfer War and its Crisis in Iraq, which he believes makes similar arguments to Smith's, though the two reach slightly different conclusions—Smith that force should only be used as part of a wider political strategy, Shaw that war should be avoided where at all possible but that use of force is sometimes inevitable. Woollacott described Smith as "a soldier trying to wrest some continuing purpose for his profession", and described both books as "very worthwhile efforts to map difficult ground".

Sir Adam Roberts, professor of international relations at the University of Oxford, was more critical in reviewing The Utility of Force for The Independent. Roberts believed that Smith over-stated the transformation into the new paradigm of war by playing down the extent to which there have always been wars amongst the people, over-emphasised the role of technology in the shift from industrial warfare, and downplayed the continuation of industrial war. By way of example, Roberts points to the Iran–Iraq War and the role of precision bombing used by the United States in its campaigns since the end of the 20th century. In conclusion, Roberts states that "it is possible to quibble over many details", but that "such quibbles miss the essential point of the book: that involvement in today's crises, in the attempt to stop atrocities and bring wars to an end, requires a capacity for clear thought, a sensitivity to situation, and a talent for acting, that armed forces and their officers have not always possessed – and now badly need".

Writing in the journal of the Royal United Services Institute (RUSI), Christopher Coker, professor of international relations at London School of Economics, gave a detailed analysis of Smith's opening sentence, "war no longer exists". He concluded that war had metastasised, but that war was not over, and that Smith's "eye-catching quote detracts from the force of his own argument". Nevertheless, Coker praises Smith for the latter's criticism of those who failed to recognise the shift in the paradigm of war, and of the lack of strategy in the military campaigns of the late 20th and early 21st centuries. Coker concludes with the statement: "[Smith's] experience, distilled in a book sometimes too controversial for its own good, should become standard reading in every military academy".

In 2013, General David Richards, then Chief of the Defence Staff, included The Utility of Force on a list of publications that he recommended to officers wishing to improve their leadership skills.

== See also ==
- The Art of War, by Sun Tzu
