= List of paradoxes =

List of statements that appear to contradict themselves

This list includes well known paradoxes, grouped thematically. The grouping is approximate, as paradoxes may fit into more than one category. These paradoxes may be due to fallacious reasoning (falsidical), or an unintuitive solution (veridical). The term paradox is often used to describe a counter-intuitive result.

However, some of these paradoxes qualify to fit into the mainstream viewpoint of a paradox, which is a self-contradictory result gained even while properly applying accepted ways of reasoning. These paradoxes, often called antinomy, point out genuine problems in our understanding of the ideas of truth and description.

== Logic ==
- Barbershop paradox: The supposition that, "if one of two simultaneous assumptions leads to a contradiction, the other assumption is also disproved" leads to paradoxical consequences. Not to be confused with the Barber paradox.
- What the Tortoise Said to Achilles: If a presumption needs to be made that a specific result can be deduced from premises, then the result can never be deduced. An inference rule, which is valid (or not), cannot be a premise, which is true (or false), otherwise one has an infinite regress. Also known as Carroll's paradox and is not to be confused with the "Achilles and the tortoise" paradox by Zeno of Elea.
- Catch-22: A situation in which someone is in need of something that can only be had by not being in need of it. A soldier who wants to be declared insane to avoid combat is deemed not insane for that very reason and will therefore not be declared insane.
- Drinker paradox: In any pub, there is a customer such that if that customer is drinking, everybody in the pub is drinking.
- Paradox of free choice: Disjunction introduction poses a problem for modal inferences, permitting arbitrary modal statements to be inferred.
- Paradox of entailment: Inconsistent premises always make an argument valid.
- Lottery paradox: If there is one winning ticket in a large lottery, it is reasonable to believe of any particular lottery ticket that it is not the winning ticket, but it is not reasonable to believe that no lottery ticket will win.
- Raven paradox: (or Hempel's Ravens): Observing a green apple increases the likelihood of all ravens being black.
- Ross' paradox: Disjunction introduction poses a problem for imperative inference by seemingly permitting arbitrary imperatives to be inferred.
- Temperature paradox: If the temperature is 90 and the temperature is rising, that would seem to entail that 90 is rising.
- Unexpected hanging paradox: The day of the hanging will be a surprise, so it cannot happen at all, so it will be a surprise. The surprise examination and Bottle Imp paradox use similar logic.

=== Self-reference ===
The Pinocchio paradox causes Pinocchio's nose to grow if and only if it does not grow.

These paradoxes, insolubilia (insolubles), have in common a contradiction arising from either self-reference or circular reference, in which several statements refer to each other in a way that following some of the references leads back to the starting point.

- Barber paradox: A male barber shaves all and only those men who do not shave themselves. Does he shave himself? (Russell's popularization of his set theoretic paradox.) Not to be confused with the Barbershop paradox.
- Bhartrhari's paradox: The thesis that there are some things which are unnameable conflicts with the notion that something is named by calling it unnameable.
- Berry paradox: The phrase "the first number not nameable in under ten words" appears to name it in nine words.
- Crocodile dilemma: If a crocodile steals a child and promises its return if the father can correctly guess exactly what the crocodile will do, how should the crocodile respond in the case that the father guesses that the child will not be returned?
- Paradox of the Court: A law student agrees to pay his teacher after (and only after) winning his first case. The teacher then sues the student (who has not yet won a case) for payment.
- Curry's paradox: "If this sentence is true, then Germany borders China."
- Epimenides paradox: A Cretan says: "All Cretans are liars". This paradox works in mainly the same way as the liar paradox.
- Grelling–Nelson paradox: Is the word "heterological", meaning "not applicable to itself", a heterological word? (A close relative of Russell's paradox.)
- Hilbert–Bernays paradox: If there was a name for a natural number that is identical to a name of the successor of that number, there would be a natural number equal to its successor.
- I know that I know nothing: Purportedly said by Socrates.
- Kleene–Rosser paradox: By formulating an equivalent to Richard's paradox, untyped lambda calculus is shown to be inconsistent.
- Knower paradox: "This sentence is not known."
- Liar paradox: "This sentence is false." This is the canonical self-referential paradox. Also "Is the answer to this question 'no'?", and "I'm lying."
  - Card paradox: "The next statement is true. The previous statement is false." A variant of the liar paradox in which neither of the sentences employs (direct) self-reference, instead this is a case of circular reference.
  - No-no paradox: Two sentences that each say the other is not true.
  - Pinocchio paradox: What would happen if Pinocchio said "My nose grows now"?
  - Quine's paradox: "'Yields a falsehood when appended to its own quotation' yields a falsehood when appended to its own quotation." Shows that a sentence can be paradoxical even if it is not self-referring and does not use demonstratives or indexicals.
  - Yablo's paradox: An ordered infinite sequence of sentences, each of which says that all following sentences are false. While constructed to avoid self-reference, there is no consensus whether it relies on self-reference or not.
- Opposite Day: "It is opposite day today." Therefore, it is not opposite day, but if one says it is a normal day it would be considered a normal day, which contradicts the fact that it has previously been stated that it is an opposite day.
- Richard's paradox: We appear to be able to use simple English to define a decimal expansion in a way that is self-contradictory.
- Russell's paradox: Does the set of all those sets that do not contain themselves contain itself?

=== Vagueness ===
Ship of Theseus: If one eventually replaces all the parts of a ship over time, is it still the same ship?

- Ship of Theseus: It seems as if one can replace any component of a ship, and it is still the same ship. So they can replace them all, one at a time, and it is still the same ship. However, they can then take all the original pieces, and assemble them into a ship. That, too, is the same ship they began with.
- Sorites paradox (also known as the paradox of the heap): If one removes a single grain of sand from a heap, they still have a heap. If they keep removing single grains, the heap will disappear. Can a single grain of sand make the difference between heap and non-heap?

== Mathematics ==
- All horses are the same color: A fallacious argument by induction that appears to prove that all horses are the same color.
- Ant on a rubber rope: An ant crawling on a rubber rope can reach the end even when the rope stretches much faster than the ant can crawl.
- Cramer's paradox: The number of points of intersection of two higher-order curves can be greater than the number of arbitrary points needed to define one such curve.
- Elevator paradox: Elevators can seem to be mostly going in one direction, as if they were being manufactured in the middle of the building and being disassembled on the roof and basement.
- Interesting number paradox: The first number that can be considered "dull" rather than "interesting" becomes interesting because of that fact.
- Potato paradox: If potatoes consisting of 99% water dry until they are 98% water, they lose 50% of their weight.
- Russell's paradox: Does the set of all those sets that do not contain themselves contain itself?

=== Statistics ===
- Abelson's paradox: Effect size may not be indicative of practical meaning.
- Accuracy paradox: Predictive models with a given level of accuracy may have greater predictive power than models with higher accuracy.
- Berkson's paradox: A complicating factor arising in statistical tests of proportions.
- Freedman's paradox: Describes a problem in model selection where predictor variables with no explanatory power can appear artificially important.
- Friendship paradox: For almost everyone, their friends have more friends than they do.
- Inspection paradox: (Bus waiting time paradox) For a given random distribution of bus arrivals, the average rider at a bus stop observes more delays than the average operator of the buses.
- Lindley's paradox: Tiny errors in the null hypothesis are magnified when large data sets are analyzed, leading to false but highly statistically significant results.
- Low birth weight paradox: Low birth weight and mothers who smoke contribute to a higher mortality rate. Babies of smokers have lower average birth weight, but low birth weight babies born to smokers have a lower mortality rate than other low birth weight babies. This is a special case of Simpson's paradox.
- Simpson's paradox, or the Yule–Simpson effect: A trend that appears in different groups of data disappears when these groups are combined, and the reverse trend appears for the aggregate data.
- Will Rogers phenomenon: The mathematical concept of an average, whether defined as the mean or median, leads to apparently paradoxical results—for example, it is possible that moving an entry from an encyclopedia to a dictionary would increase the average entry length on both books.

=== Probability ===
The Monty Hall problem: which door should one choose to maximize the probability of winning?

- Bertrand's box paradox: A paradox of conditional probability closely related to the Boy or Girl paradox.
- Bertrand's paradox: Different common-sense definitions of randomness give quite different results.
- Birthday paradox: In a random group of only 23 people, there is a better than 50/50 chance two of them have the same birthday.
- Borel's paradox: Conditional probability density functions are not invariant under coordinate transformations.
- Boy or Girl paradox: A two-child family has at least one boy. What is the probability that it has a girl?
- False positive paradox: A test that is accurate the vast majority of the time could show that someone has a disease, but the probability that they actually have it could still be tiny.
- Grice's paradox: Shows that the exact meaning of statements involving conditionals and probabilities is more complicated than may be obvious on casual examination.
- Intransitive dice: One can have three dice, called A, B, and C, such that A is likely to win in a roll against B, B is likely to win in a roll against C, and C is likely to win in a roll against A.
- Monty Hall problem, also known as the Monty Hall paradox: An unintuitive consequence of conditional probability.
- Necktie paradox: A wager between two people seems to favour them both. Very similar in essence to the two-envelope paradox.
- Proebsting's paradox: The Kelly criterion is an often optimal strategy for maximizing profit in the long run. Proebsting's paradox apparently shows that the Kelly criterion can lead to ruin.
- Sleeping Beauty problem: A probability problem that can be correctly answered as one half or one third depending on how the question is approached.
- Three Prisoners problem, also known as the Three Prisoners paradox: A variation of the Monty Hall problem.
- Two-envelope paradox: Two indistinguishable envelopes each contains a positive sum of money. One envelope contains twice as much as the other. One may pick one envelope and keep whatever amount it contains. After they picked an envelope at random but before they open it, they are given the chance to take the other envelope instead.

=== Infinity and infinitesimals ===
- Burali-Forti paradox: If the ordinal numbers formed a set, it would be an ordinal number that is smaller than itself.
- Cantor's paradox: The set of all sets would have its own power set as a subset, therefore its cardinality would be at least as great as that of its power set. But Cantor's theorem proves that power sets are strictly greater than the sets they are constructed from. Consequently, the set of all sets would contain a subset greater than itself.
- Galileo's paradox: Though most numbers are not squares, there are no more numbers than squares. (See also Cantor's diagonal argument)
- Hilbert's paradox of the Grand Hotel: If a hotel with infinitely many rooms is full, it can still take in more guests.
- Skolem's paradox: Countably infinite models of set theory contain sets that are uncountable in the sense of the model.
- Zeno's paradoxes: "One will never reach point B from point A as they must always get half-way there, and half of the half, and half of that half, and so on ..." This is also a physical paradox.
- Supertasks may result in paradoxes such as

- Benardete's paradox: An infinite number of gods place barriers to stop a man advancing, but there can be no individual god responsible for preventing him.
- Grim Reaper paradox: An infinite number of assassins can create an explicit self-contradiction by scheduling their assassinations at certain times.
- Grandi's series: The sum of 1−1+1−1+1−1... can be either one, zero, or one-half.
- Ross–Littlewood paradox: After alternately adding and removing balls to a vase infinitely often, how many balls remain?
- Thomson's lamp: After flicking a lamp on and off infinitely often, is it on or off?

=== Geometry and topology ===
The Banach–Tarski paradox: A ball can be decomposed and reassembled into two balls the same size as the original.

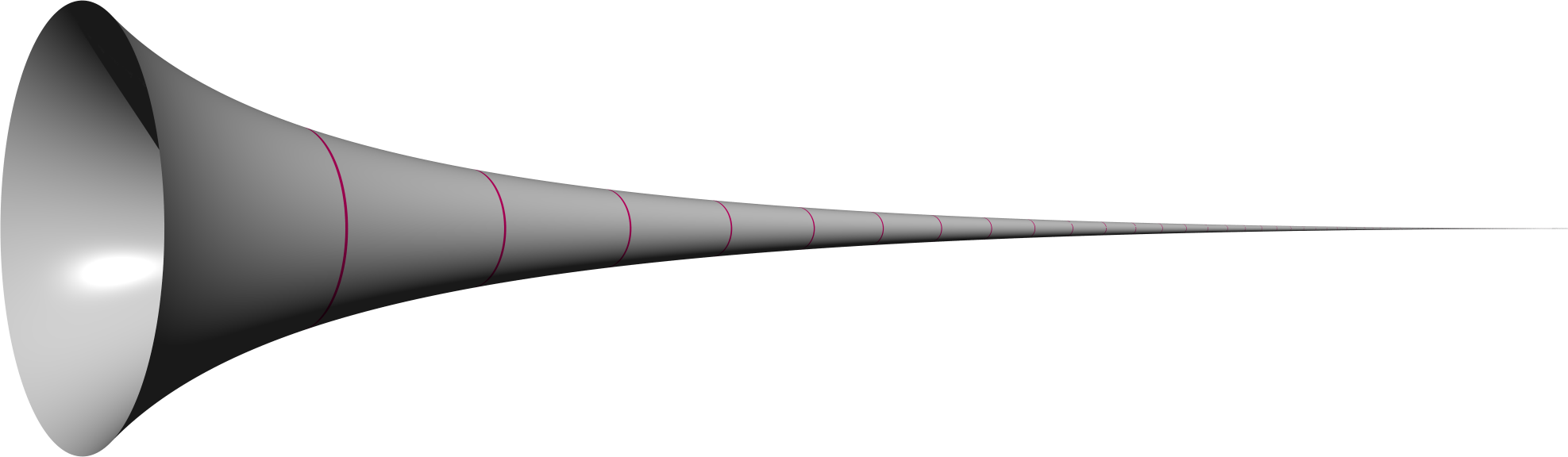
Gabriel's Horn has a finite volume but infinite surface area

- Banach–Tarski paradox: A ball can be cut into a finite number of pieces and re-assembling the pieces will get two balls, each of equal size to the first. The von Neumann paradox is a two-dimensional version.
  - Paradoxical set: A set that can be partitioned into two sets, each of which is equivalent to the original.
- Coastline paradox: The perimeter of a landmass is in general ill-defined.
- Coin rotation paradox: A coin rotating along the edge of an identical coin will make a full revolution after traversing only half of the stationary coin's circumference.
- Gabriel's Horn: or Torricelli's trumpet: A simple object with finite volume but infinite surface area. Also, the Mandelbrot set and various other fractals are covered by a finite area, but have an infinite perimeter (in fact, there are no two distinct points on the boundary of the Mandelbrot set that can be reached from one another by moving a finite distance along that boundary, which also implies that in a sense going "the wrong way" around the set to reach a nearby point isn't further than "the right way").
- Hausdorff paradox: There exists a countable subset C of the sphere S such that S\C is equidecomposable with two copies of itself.
- Hooper's paradox: An image with many pieces whose size is 32 m^{2}, but drops down to 30 m^{2} when its pieces are rearranged
- Nikodym set: A set contained in and with the same Lebesgue measure as the unit square, yet for every one of its points there is a straight line intersecting the Nikodym set only in that point.
- Sphere eversion: A sphere can, topologically, be turned inside out.

== Decision theory ==
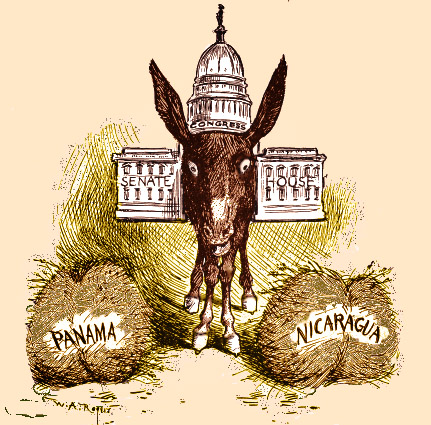
Buridan's ass, unable to choose between two equally good options

- Abilene paradox: People can make decisions based not on what they actually want to do, but on what they think that other people want to do, with the result that everybody decides to do something that nobody really wants to do, but only what they thought that everybody else wanted to do.
- Apportionment paradox: Some systems of apportioning representation can have unintuitive results due to rounding
  - Alabama paradox: Increasing the total number of seats might shrink one bloc's seats.
  - New states paradox: Adding a new state or voting bloc might increase the number of votes of another.
  - Population paradox: A fast-growing state can lose votes to a slow-growing state.
- Arrow's paradox: Given more than two choices, no system can have all the attributes of an ideal voting system at once.
- Buridan's ass: How can a rational choice be made between two outcomes of equal value?
- Chainstore paradox: Even those who know better play the so-called chain store game in an irrational manner.
- Decision-making paradox: Selecting the best decision-making method is a decision problem in itself.
- Ellsberg paradox: People exhibit ambiguity aversion (as distinct from risk aversion), in contradiction with expected utility theory.
- Fenno's paradox: The belief that people generally disapprove of the United States Congress as a whole, but support the Congressman from their own Congressional district.
- Fredkin's paradox: The more similar two choices are, the more time a decision-making agent spends on deciding.
- Green paradox: Policies intending to reduce future CO_{2} emissions may lead to increased emissions in the present.
- Hedgehog's dilemma: Despite goodwill, human intimacy cannot occur without substantial mutual harm.
- Inventor's paradox: It is easier to solve a more general problem that covers the specifics of the sought-after solution.
- Kavka's toxin puzzle: Can one intend to drink the non-deadly toxin, if the intention is the only thing needed to get the reward?
- Motivation crowding theory: Adding incentives for some behavior can sometimes backfire and actually result in less of that behavior.
- Morton's fork: a type of false dilemma in which contradictory observations lead to the same conclusion.
- Navigation paradox: Increased navigational precision may result in increased collision risk.
- Newcomb's paradox: How to play a game against an omniscient opponent?
- No-show paradox: A situation in some voting systems where voting for one's candidate could cause them to lose, as opposed to not showing up to vote.
- Paradox of voting: Also known as the Downs paradox. For a rational, self-interested voter the costs of voting will normally exceed the expected benefits, so why do people keep voting?
- Parrondo's paradox: It is possible to play two losing games alternately to eventually win.
- Preparedness paradox: After preparing to avoid a catastrophe and lessening the damage, the perception regarding the catastrophe would be much less serious due to the limited damage caused after.
- Prevention paradox: For one person to benefit, many people have to change their behavior – even though they receive no benefit, or even suffer, from the change.
- Prisoner's dilemma: Two people might not cooperate even if it is in both their best interests to do so.
- Voting paradox: Also known as Condorcet's paradox and paradox of voting. A group of separately rational individuals may have preferences that are irrational in the aggregate.
- Willpower paradox: Those who keep their minds open are more goal-directed and more motivated than those who declare their objectives to themselves.

== Physics ==
- Cool tropics paradox: A contradiction between modelled estimates of tropical temperatures during warm, ice-free periods of the Cretaceous and Eocene, and the lower temperatures that proxies suggest were present.
- Irresistible force paradox: What would happen if an unstoppable force hits an immovable object?
- The moving rows: Suppose two rows are moving past a stationary row in opposite directions. If a member of a moving row moves past a member of the stationary row in an indivisible instant of time, they move past two members of the row that is moving in the other direction in this instant of time.
- Paradox of place: If everything that exists has a place, that place must have a place, and so on ad infinitum.
- Paradox of the grain of millet: When a grain of millet falls it makes no sound, but when a thousand grains fall they do, thus many of nothing become something.

=== Astrophysics ===
- Algol paradox: In some binary star systems the partners seem to have different ages, even though they are thought to have formed at the same time.
- Faint young Sun paradox: The contradiction between existence of liquid water early in the Earth's history and the expectation that the output of the young Sun would have been insufficient to melt ice on Earth.
- Olbers' paradox: Why is the night sky dark if there is an infinity of stars, covering every part of the celestial sphere?
- GZK paradox: Extreme-energy cosmic rays (like the Oh-My-God particle and several others after it) have been observed that seem to violate the Greisen–Zatsepin–Kuzmin limit, which is a consequence of special relativity.
- Paradox of youth: Compared to theory, there is an overabundance of young stars close to the supermassive black hole in the Galactic Center.
- Voyager paradox: Voyager 1 crossed the heliopause without detecting the anomalous cosmic ray peak predicted by almost all models.

=== Classical mechanics ===
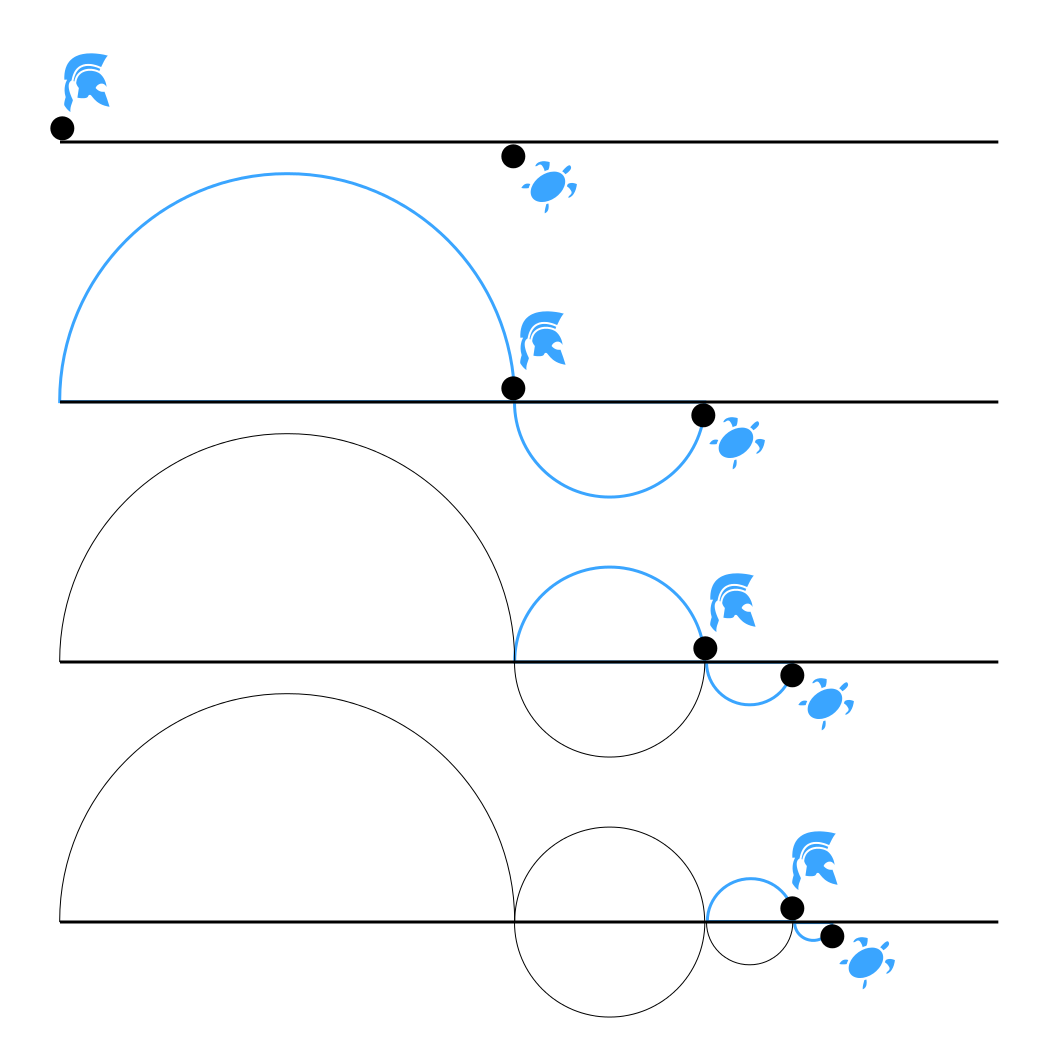
Achilles and the tortoise: Achilles can seemingly never catch up to the tortoise if the tortoise receives a head start

- Achilles and the tortoise: If the tortoise is ahead of Achilles, by the time Achilles reaches the tortoise's current position, the tortoise will have moved a bit further ahead, which goes on indefinitely.
- Archer's paradox: An archer must, in order to hit his target, not aim directly at it, but slightly to the side. Not to be confused with the arrow paradox.
- Arrow paradox : If we divide time into discrete 0-duration slices, no motion is happening in each of them, so taking them all as a whole, motion is impossible.
- Aristotle's wheel paradox: Rolling joined concentric wheels seem to trace the same distance with their circumferences, even though the circumferences are different.
- Carroll's paradox: The angular momentum of a stick should be zero, but is not.
- Dichotomy paradox: To reach its target, an airborne arrow must first reach an infinite number of midpoints between its current position and the target.
- Norton's dome: Are there non-deterministic systems in Newtonian mechanics?
- Painlevé paradox: Rigid-body dynamics with contact and friction is inconsistent.

=== Cosmology ===
- Bentley's paradox: In a Newtonian universe, gravitation should pull all matter into a single point.
- Boltzmann brain: If the universe we observe resulted from a random thermodynamic fluctuation, it would be vastly more likely to be a simple one than the complex one we observe. The simplest case would be just a brain floating in vacuum, having the thoughts and sensations an ostensible observer has.
- Fermi paradox: If there are, as various arguments suggest, many other sentient species in the universe, then where are they? Should their presence not be obvious?
- Heat death paradox: If the universe were infinitely old, it would be in thermodynamic equilibrium, which contradicts what we observe.

=== Fluid mechanics ===
A demonstration of the tea leaf paradox

- Denny's paradox: Surface-dwelling arthropods (such as the water strider) should not be able to propel themselves horizontally.
- D'Alembert's paradox: Flow of an inviscid fluid produces no net force on a solid body.
- Earnshaw paradox: Waves cannot travel uniformly in an ideal fluid
- Elevator paradox: Even though hydrometers are used to measure fluid density, a hydrometer will not indicate changes of fluid density caused by changing atmospheric pressure.
- Feynman sprinkler: Which way does a sprinkler rotate when submerged in a tank and made to suck in the surrounding fluid?
- Hydrostatic paradox: A massive battleship can float in a few litres of water.
- Knudsen paradox: Based on the Navier–Stokes equations, one would expect the mass flux in a channel to decrease with increasing Knudsen number, but there is a distinct minimum around Knudsen number 0.8.
- Stokes' paradox: there can be no creeping flow of a fluid around a disk in two dimensions.
- Tea leaf paradox: When a cup of tea is stirred, the leaves assemble in the center, even though centrifugal force pushes them outward.
- Upstream contamination: When a fluid is poured from a higher container onto a lower one, particles can climb up the falling water.

=== Electromagnetism ===
- Faraday paradox: An apparent violation of Faraday's law of electromagnetic induction.
- Two capacitor paradox: an apparent violation of energy of an electric circuit composed of two ideal capacitors

=== Quantum mechanics ===
Schrödinger's cat, while unobserved, is simultaneously alive and dead

- Aharonov–Bohm effect: A charged particle is affected by an electromagnetic field even though it has no local contact with that field.
- Bell's theorem: Why do measured quantum particles not satisfy mathematical probability theory?
- Double-slit experiment: Matter and energy can act as a wave or as a particle depending on the experiment.
- Einstein–Podolsky–Rosen paradox: Can far away events influence each other in quantum mechanics?
- Extinction paradox: In the small wavelength limit, the total scattering cross section of an impenetrable sphere is twice its geometrical cross-sectional area (which is the value obtained in classical mechanics).
- Hardy's paradox: How can we make inferences about past events that we have not observed while at the same time acknowledge that the act of observing it affects the reality we are inferring to?
- Klein paradox: When the potential of a potential barrier becomes similar to the mass of the impinging particle, it becomes transparent.
- Mott problem, also known as the Mott paradox: Spherically symmetric wave functions, when observed, produce linear particle tracks.
- Quantum Zeno effect: (Turing paradox) echoing the Zeno paradox, a quantum particle that is continuously observed cannot change its state.
- Schrödinger's cat paradox: According to the Copenhagen interpretation of quantum mechanics, a cat could be simultaneously alive and dead, as long as it remains unobserved.
- Uncertainty principle: There is a fundamental limit to the precision with which certain pairs of physical properties of a particle, known as complementary variables, such as position and momentum can be known. This is often confused with a similar effect in physics called the observer effect.
- Wigner's friend: A friend inside a sealed room observes a definite outcome, while Wigner outside can treat the entire laboratory as a quantum superposition. The paradox is whether both descriptions of reality can be simultaneously valid.
- Quantum Cheshire cat: A thought experiment, where a quantum system appears to be separated from one of its own properties.
- Hartman effect: The time a particle spends tunneling through a barrier appears independent of the barrier's thickness, so particles seem to tunnel instantaneously; this appears as superluminal tunneling.
- Scharnhorst effect: Light can have a group velocity slightly greater than the speed of light in a vacuum between two closely spaced, parallel conducting plates.
- Interaction-free measurement: A type of measurement in quantum mechanics that detects the position, presence, or state of an object without any interaction occurring between it and the measuring device.

=== Relativity ===
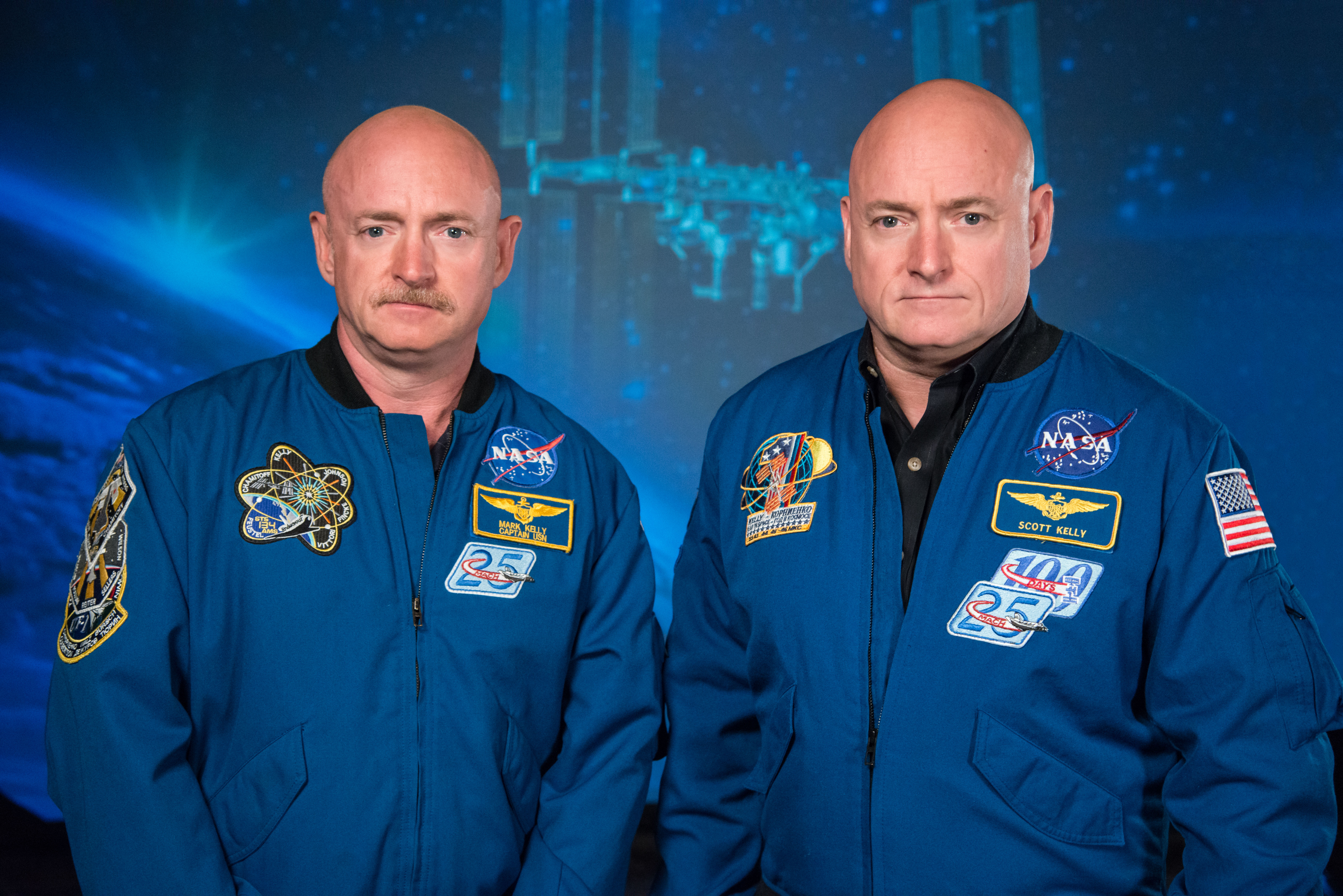
Twin paradox: During the ISS year-long mission, astronaut Scott Kelly (right) aged about 8.6 milliseconds less than his twin brother Mark (left), on Earth, due to relativistic effects.

- Bell's spaceship paradox: About the stress on a rope under the effects of length contraction.
- Black hole information paradox: Black holes violate a commonly assumed tenet of science that information cannot be destroyed.
- Ehrenfest paradox: On the kinematics of a rigid rotating disk.
- Ladder paradox: Introductory relativity problem about a ladder, a barn, and simultaneity.
- Mocanu's velocity composition paradox: Which formula should be used to transform velocities between non-collinear reference frames in special relativity?
- Paradox of radiation of charged particles in a gravitational field: An accelerated charge should radiate, yet such radiation is not observed for stationary particles on gravitational fields.
- Supplee's paradox: The buoyancy of a relativistic object (such as a bullet) appears to change when the reference frame is changed from one in which the bullet is at rest to one in which the fluid is at rest.
- Tachyonic antitelephone: Einstein's thought experiment about how faster-than-light communication could cause a causality paradox.
- Trouton-Noble or Right-angle lever paradox: Does a torque arise in static systems when changing frames?
- Twin paradox: The theory of relativity predicts that a person making a round trip will return younger than their identical twin who stayed at home.

=== Thermodynamics ===
Maxwell's demon seems to violate the laws of thermodynamics

- Gibbs paradox: In an ideal gas, is entropy an extensive variable?
- Kauzmann's paradox: if a liquid could be supercooled indefinitely, its entropy would be lower than that of its solid phase.
- Loschmidt's paradox: Why is there an inevitable increase in entropy when the laws of physics are invariant under time reversal? The time reversal symmetry of physical laws appears to contradict the second law of thermodynamics.
- Maxwell's demon: The second law of thermodynamics seems to be violated by a cleverly operated trapdoor.
- Mpemba effect: Hot water can, under certain conditions, freeze faster than cold water, even though it must pass the lower temperature on the way to freezing.

== Biology ==
- Antarctic paradox: In some areas of the oceans, phytoplankton concentrations are low despite there apparently being sufficient nutrients.
- C-value enigma: Genome size does not correlate with organismal complexity. For example, some unicellular organisms have genomes much larger than that of humans.
- Cole's paradox: Even a tiny fecundity advantage of one additional offspring would favor the evolution of semelparity.
- Gray's paradox: Despite their relatively small muscle mass, dolphins can swim at high speeds and obtain large accelerations.
- Hormesis: Exposure to small doses of toxins can have beneficial effects.
- Lek paradox: Persistent female choice for particular male trait values should erode genetic variance in male traits and thereby remove the benefits of choice, yet choice persists.
- Lombard's paradox: When rising to stand from a sitting or squatting position, both the hamstrings and quadriceps contract at the same time, despite their being antagonists to each other.
- Paradox of enrichment: Increasing the food available to an ecosystem may lead to instability, and even to extinction.
- Paradox of the pesticides: Applying pesticide to a pest may increase the pest's abundance.
- Paradox of the plankton: Why are there so many different species of phytoplankton, even though competition for the same resources tends to reduce the number of species?
- Sherman paradox: An anomalous pattern of inheritance in the fragile X syndrome.
- Taxonomic boundary paradox: The concept for a taxon can overlap in the past.
- Temporal paradox (paleontology): When did the ancestors of birds live?
- Charlesworth's paradox: Hamilton's rule for the evolution of altruistic behavior seems to predict cases that would lead to extinction.
- Washburn's paradox: Kin selection should predict universal altruism due to the genetic similarity within species.
- The paradox of variation: There is an apparent mismatch between the observed range of genetic diversity and the predictions of neutral theory.

=== Health and nutrition ===
- Exercise paradox: The finding that individuals with an active lifestyle have a relatively similar caloric expenditure to individuals in a sedentary lifestyle.
- French paradox: The observation that the French suffer a relatively low incidence of coronary heart disease, despite having a diet relatively rich in saturated fats, which are assumed to be the leading dietary cause of such disease.
- Glucose paradox: The large amount of glycogen in the liver cannot be explained by its small glucose absorption.
- Hispanic paradox: The finding that Hispanics in the United States tend to have substantially better health than the average population in spite of what their aggregate socio-economic indicators predict.
- Israeli paradox: The observation that Israelis suffer a relatively high incidence of coronary heart disease, despite having a diet very low in saturated fats, which are assumed to be the leading dietary cause of such disease.
- Mexican paradox: Mexican children tend to have higher birth weights than can be expected from their socio-economic status.
- Obesity paradox: In some medical conditions, obesity is associated with increased survival, although there is a strong association with shortened lifespan in the general population.
- Peto's paradox: Humans and other small-to-medium-sized mammals get cancer with high frequency, while larger mammals, like whales, do not. If cancer is essentially a negative outcome lottery at the cell level, and larger organisms have more cells, and thus more potentially cancerous cell divisions, one would expect larger organisms to be more predisposed to cancer.
- Pulsus paradoxus: A pulsus paradoxus is an exaggerated decrease in systolic blood pressure during inspiration. It can indicate certain medical conditions in which there is reduced cardiac output, such as cardiac tamponade or constrictive pericarditis. Also known as the Pulse Paradox.
- Second wind: The "second wind" is a sudden period of increased wakefulness in individuals deprived of sleep that tends to coincide with the individual's circadian rhythm. Although the individual is more wakeful and aware of their surroundings, they are continuing to accrue sleep debt, and thus are actually exacerbating their sleep deprivation.

== Chemistry ==
- Faraday paradox (electrochemistry): Diluted nitric acid will corrode steel, while concentrated nitric acid will not.
- Levinthal paradox: The length of time that it takes for a protein chain to find its folded state is many orders of magnitude shorter than it would be if it freely searched all possible configurations.
- SAR paradox: Exceptions to the principle that a small change in a molecule causes a small change in its chemical behavior are frequently profound.

== Time travel ==
Polchinski's paradox: a billiard ball travels back in time and prevents itself from traveling back in time

- Bootstrap paradox (also ontological paradox): One sends information/an object to their past self, but they only have that information/object because in the past, they received it from their future self. This means the information/object was never created, yet still exists.
- Predestination paradox: Someone travels back in time to discover the cause of a famous fire. While in the building where the fire started, they accidentally knock over a kerosene lantern and cause a fire, the same fire that would inspire them, years later, to travel back in time. The bootstrap paradox is closely tied to this, in which, as a result of time travel, information or objects appear to have no beginning.
- Temporal paradox: What happens if a time traveler alters the past in a way that prevents their actions from happening in the first place?

- Grandfather paradox: If one travels back in time and kills their grandfather before he conceives one of their parents, which precludes their own conception and, therefore, they could not go back in time and kill their grandfather.
- Polchinski's paradox: A billiard ball can be thrown into a wormhole in such a way that it would emerge in the past and knock its incoming past self away from the wormhole entrance, creating a variant of the grandfather paradox.
- Hitler's murder paradox: One can travel back in time and murder Adolf Hitler before he can instigate World War II and the Holocaust; but if he had never instigated that, then the murder removes any reason for the travel.

== Linguistics and artificial intelligence ==
- Bracketing paradox: Is a "historical linguist" a linguist who is historical, or someone who studies "historical linguistics"?
- Code-talker paradox: How can a language both enable communication and block communication?
- Moravec's paradox: Logical thought is hard for humans and easy for computers, but picking a screw from a box of screws is an unsolved problem.
- Movement paradox: In transformational linguistics, there are pairs of sentences in which the sentence without movement is ungrammatical while the sentence with movement is not.
- Sayre's paradox: In automated handwriting recognition, a cursively written word cannot be recognized without being segmented and cannot be segmented without being recognized.

== Philosophy ==
- Paradox of analysis: It seems that no conceptual analysis can meet the requirements both of correctness and of informativeness.
- Buridan's bridge: Plato says: "If your next statement is true, I will allow you to cross, but if it is false, I will throw you in the water." Socrates responds: "You will throw me in the water." Whatever Plato does, he will seemingly break his promise. Similar to the crocodile dilemma.
- Paradox of fiction: How can people experience strong emotions from purely fictional things?
- Fitch's paradox: If all truths are knowable, then all truths must in fact be known.
- Paradox of free will: If God knows in advance what a person will decide, how can there be free will?
- Goodman's paradox: Why can induction be used to confirm that things are "green", but not to confirm that things are "grue"?
- Paradox of hedonism: When one pursues happiness itself, one is miserable; but, when one pursues something else, one achieves happiness.
- Liberal paradox: "Minimal Liberty" is incompatible with Pareto optimality.
- Meno's paradox: (Learner's paradox) A man cannot search either for what he knows or for what he does not know.
- Mere addition paradox: (Parfit's paradox) Is a large population living a barely tolerable life better than a small, happy population?
- Moore's paradox: "It's raining, but I don't believe that it is."
- Newcomb's paradox: A paradoxical game between two players, one of whom can predict the actions of the other.
- Paradox of nihilism: Several distinct paradoxes share this name.
- Omnipotence paradox: Can an omnipotent being create a rock too heavy for itself to lift?
- Polanyi's paradox: "We know more than we can tell", Polanyi's paradox brings to attention the cognitive phenomenon that there exist tasks which human beings understand intuitively how to perform but cannot verbalise the rules behind.
- Preface paradox: The author of a book may be justified in believing that all their statements in the book are correct, at the same time believing that at least one of them is incorrect.
- Problem of evil: (Epicurean paradox) The existence of evil seems to be incompatible with the existence of an omnipotent, omniscient, and morally perfect God.
- Rule-following paradox: Even though rules are intended to determine actions, "no course of action could be determined by a rule, because any course of action can be made out to accord with the rule".
- When a white horse is not a horse: White horses are not horses because white and horse refer to different things.
- Zeno's paradoxes: "One will never reach point B from point A as they must always get half-way there, and half of the half, and half of that half, and so on ..." This is also a paradox of the infinite.

== Mysticism ==
- Tzimtzum: In Kabbalah, how to reconcile self-awareness of finite Creation with Infinite Divine source, as an emanated causal chain would seemingly nullify existence. Luria's initial withdrawal of God in Hasidic panentheism involves simultaneous illusionism of Creation (Upper Unity) and self-aware existence (Lower Unity), God encompassing logical opposites.

== Economics ==
One class of paradoxes in economics are the paradoxes of competition, in which behavior that benefits a lone actor would leave everyone worse off if everyone did the same. These paradoxes are classified into circuit, classical and Marx paradoxes.

- Allais paradox: A change in a possible outcome that is shared by different alternatives affects people's choices among those alternatives, in contradiction with expected utility theory.
- The Antitrust Paradox: A book arguing that antitrust enforcement artificially raised prices by protecting inefficient competitors from competition.
- Arrow information paradox: A piece of information needs to be given away before it can be sold.
- Bertrand paradox: Two players reaching a state of Nash equilibrium both find themselves with no profits gained via exploitation.
- Braess's paradox: Adding extra capacity to a network can reduce overall performance.
- Deaton paradox: Consumption varies surprisingly smoothly despite sharp variations in income.
- Demographic-economic paradox: nations or subpopulations with higher GDP per capita are observed to have fewer children, even though a richer population can support more children.
- Downs–Thomson paradox: Increasing road capacity at the expense of investments in public transport can make overall congestion on the road worse.
- Easterlin paradox: For countries with income sufficient to meet basic needs, the reported level of happiness does not correlate with national income per person.
- Edgeworth paradox: With capacity constraints, there may not be an equilibrium.
- European paradox: The perceived failure of European countries to translate scientific advances into marketable innovations.
- Gibson's paradox: Why were interest rates and prices correlated?
- Giffen paradox: Increasing the price of bread makes poor people eat more of it.
- Grossman-Stiglitz paradox: Inability to recoup cost of obtaining market information implies efficient markets cannot exist.
- Icarus paradox: Some businesses bring about their own downfall through their own successes.
- Jevons paradox: Increases in efficiency lead to even larger increases in demand.
- Leontief paradox: Some countries export labor-intensive commodities and import capital-intensive commodities, in contradiction with the Heckscher–Ohlin theorem.
- Lerner paradox: The imposition of a tariff on imports may raise the relative world price of that good.
- Lucas paradox: Capital is not flowing from developed countries to developing countries despite the fact that developing countries have lower levels of capital per worker, and therefore higher returns to capital.
- Mandeville's paradox: Actions that may be vicious to individuals may benefit society as a whole.
- Mayfield's paradox: Keeping everyone out of an information system is impossible, but so is getting everybody in.
- Metzler paradox: The imposition of a tariff on imports may reduce the relative internal price of that good.
- Paradox of prosperity: Why do generations that significantly improve the economic climate seem to generally rear a successor generation that consumes rather than produces?
- Paradox of thrift: If everyone saves more money during times of recession, then aggregate demand will fall and will in turn lower total savings in the population.
- Paradox of toil: If everyone tries to work during times of recession, lower wages will reduce prices, leading to more deflationary expectations, leading to further thrift, reducing demand and thereby reducing employment.
- Paradox of value, also known as diamond-water paradox: Water is more useful than diamonds, yet is a lot cheaper.
- Productivity paradox: (also known as Solow computer paradox): Worker productivity may go down, despite technological improvements.
- Scitovsky paradox: Using the Kaldor–Hicks criterion, an allocation A may be more efficient than allocation B, while at the same time B is more efficient than A.
- Service recovery paradox: Successfully fixing a problem with a defective product may lead to higher consumer satisfaction than in the case where no problem occurred at all.
- St. Petersburg paradox: People will only offer a modest fee for a reward of infinite expected value.
- Paradox of plenty: Countries with an abundance of natural resources tend to have less economic growth and worse development outcomes than countries with fewer natural resources.
- The paradox of banknotes: Cash transactions have decreased since the 1940s but the demand of banknotes has increased significantly since the early 2000s.
- Throw away paradox: A trader can gain by throwing away some of their initial endowment.
- Tullock paradox: Bribing politicians costs less than one would expect, considering how much profit it can yield.

== Perception ==
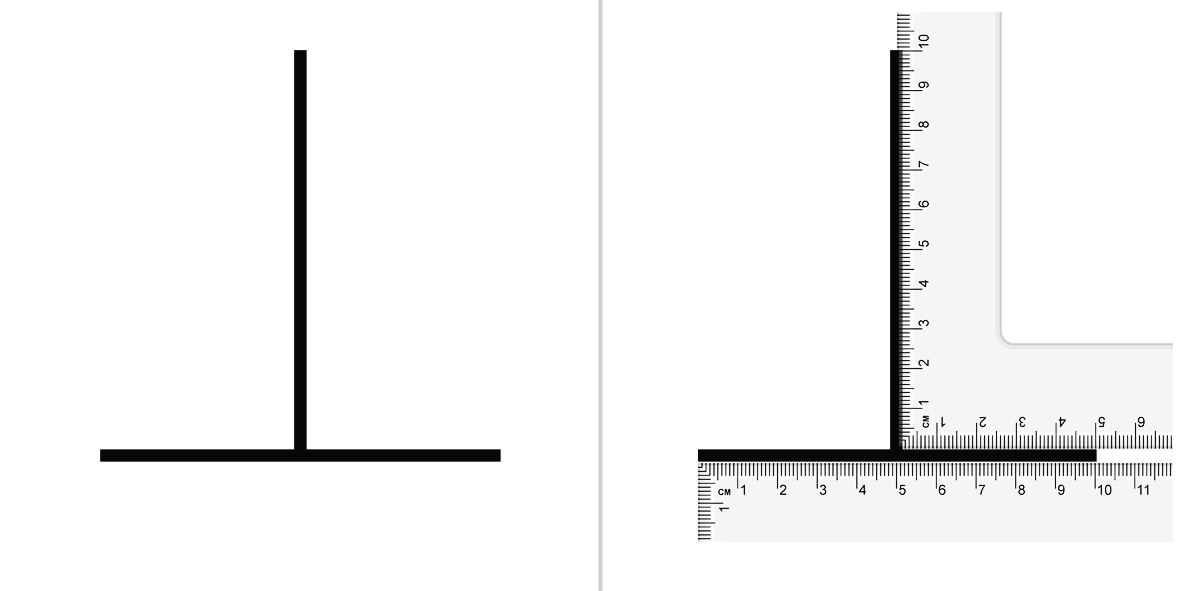
The vertical–horizontal illusion

- Tritone paradox: An auditory illusion in which a sequentially played pair of Shepard tones is heard as ascending by some people and as descending by others.
- Blub paradox: Cognitive lock of some experienced programmers that prevents them from properly evaluating the quality of programming languages which they do not know.
- Optical illusion: A visual illusion which suggests inconsistency, such as an impossible cube or the vertical-horizontal illusion, where the two lines are exactly the same length but appear to be of different lengths.

== Politics ==
- Stability–instability paradox: When two countries each have nuclear weapons, the probability of a direct war between them greatly decreases, but the probability of minor or indirect conflicts between them increases.
- Paradox of tolerance: A tolerant society that tolerates intolerant ideas becomes less tolerant overall. Closely related paradoxes are:
  - Paradox of democracy: Outside of defensive democracy, voters may elect a tyrant, thus ending democracy.
  - Paradox of freedom: Unlimited freedom enables those holding power to oppress the powerless, thereby limiting freedom.
- Wollheim's paradox: A voter can simultaneously advocate two conflicting policy options if they vote for the less popular one, assuming they believe that democratic decisions should be followed.

== Psychology and sociology ==
- Gender paradox (sociolinguistics): Women conform more closely than men to sociolinguistics norms that are overtly prescribed, but conform less than men when they are not.
- Gender-equality paradox: Countries which promote gender equality tend to have less gender balance in some fields.
- Identical twins paradox: While many studies suggest IQ to be inheritable to a large degree, the Flynn effect seems to indicate large environmental influence on IQ.
- Ironic process theory: Ironic processing is the psychological process whereby an individual's deliberate attempts to suppress or avoid certain thoughts (thought suppression) renders those thoughts more persistent.
- Meat paradox: People care about animals, but embrace diets that involve harming them.
- Moral paradox: A situation in which moral imperatives clash without clear resolution.
- Outcomes paradox: Schizophrenia patients in developing countries seem to fare better than their Western counterparts.
- Paradox of suspense: Sometimes, retelling of familiar stories appears to still induce suspense, despite the fact that the audience already knows how the story will unfold.
- Region-beta paradox: People can sometimes recover more quickly from more intense emotions or pain than from less distressing experiences.
- Sad clown paradox: Contradictory association, in performers, between comedy and mental disorders such as depression and anxiety.
- Self-absorption paradox: The contradictory association whereby higher levels of self-awareness are simultaneously associated with higher levels of psychological distress and with psychological well-being.
- Solomon's paradox: people reflect more wisely on other people's problems than on their own.
- Status paradox: Several paradoxes involve the concept of medical or social status.
- Stockdale paradox: "You must never confuse faith that you will prevail in the end—which you can never afford to lose—with the discipline to confront the most brutal facts of your current reality, whatever they might be."
- The Paradox of Choice: A book arguing that eliminating consumer choices can greatly reduce anxiety for shoppers.
- Progress paradox: Explores the tension between societal progress and individual well-being. It questions whether advancements in technology, economy, and society truly lead to greater happiness and fulfillment for individuals, or if they create new forms of dissatisfaction or inequality.

== Miscellaneous ==
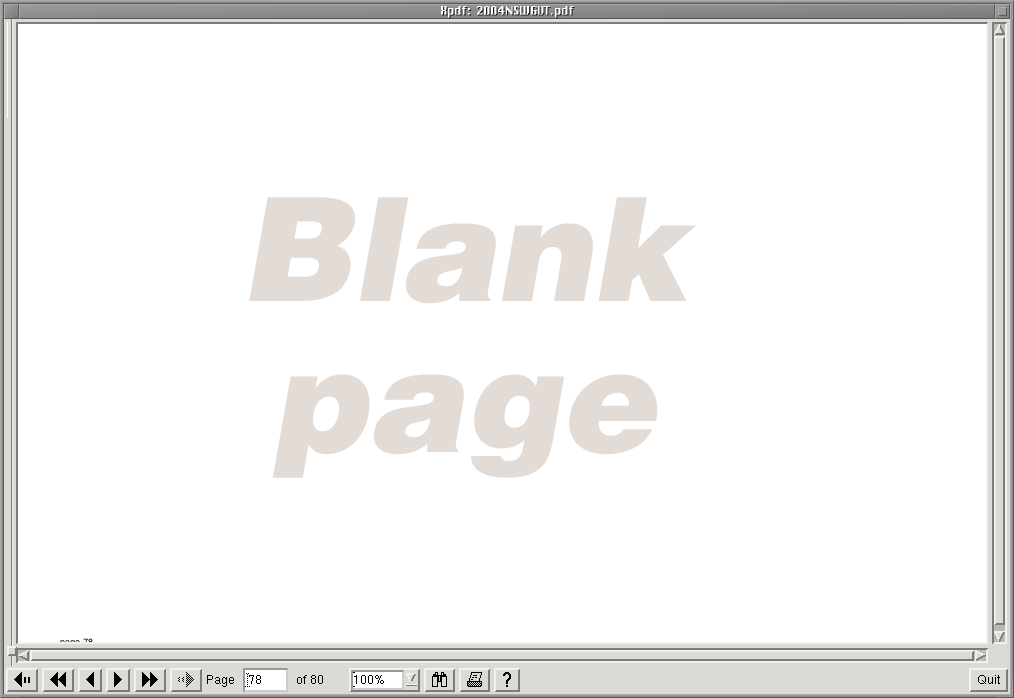
This intentionally blank page, by stating it is blank, is paradoxically not blank

- Air conditioning paradox: Air conditioning is used to cool buildings, but also makes the world hotter as a side effect.
- Bonini's paradox: Models or simulations that explain the workings of complex systems are seemingly impossible to construct. As a model of a complex system becomes more complete, it becomes less understandable; for it to be more understandable it must be less complete and therefore less accurate. When the model becomes accurate, it is just as difficult to understand as the real-world processes it represents.
- Buttered cat paradox: Humorous example of a paradox from contradicting proverbs.
- Intentionally blank page: Many documents contain pages on which the text "This page intentionally left blank" is printed, thereby making the page not blank.
- Metabasis paradox: Conflicting definitions of what is the best kind of tragedy in Aristotle's Poetics.
- Observer's paradox: The outcome of an event or experiment is influenced by the presence of the observer.
- Taeuber Paradox: A paradox in demography in which lessening mortality for a particular cause results in a surprisingly small increase in life expectancy and no change in overall mortality.

== See also ==
- Auto-antonym – A word that is encoded with opposing meanings.
- Absurdity
- Excusable negligence – If a behavior is excusable, it is not negligence.
- Gödel's incompleteness theorems – and Tarski's undefinability theorem
- Ignore all rules – To obey this rule, it is necessary to ignore it.
- Impossible object – A type of optical illusion.
- Invalid proof – An apparently correct mathematical derivation that leads to an obvious contradiction.
- Informal fallacy – A misconception resulting from incorrect reasoning in argumentation.
- Paradox gun – A gun that has characteristics of both (smoothbore) shotguns and rifles.
- Paradoxical laughter – Inappropriate laughter, often recognized as such by the laughing person.
- Performative contradiction – Some statements contradict the conditions that allow them to be stated.
- Proof that 0.999... equals 1
- Puzzle
- Self-refuting idea
- Theories of humor – Incongruity theory and the ridiculous.
- Lists of unsolved problems
