= Pinocchio paradox =

Variant of the liar paradox

The Pinocchio paradox causes Pinocchio's nose to grow if and only if it does not grow.

The Pinocchio paradox arises in the hypothetical situation when Pinocchio says "My nose will grow" and is a version of the liar paradox. The liar paradox is defined in philosophy and logic as the statement "This sentence is false." Any attempts to assign a classical binary truth value to this statement lead to a contradiction, or paradox. This occurs because if the statement "This sentence is false" is true, then it is false; this would mean that it is technically true, but also that it is false, and so on without end. Although the Pinocchio paradox belongs to the liar paradox tradition, it is a special case because it has no semantic predicates, as for example "My sentence is false" does.

The Pinocchio paradox has nothing to do with Pinocchio being a known liar. If Pinocchio were to say "I am getting tired," this could be either true or false, but Pinocchio's sentence "My nose grows now" can be neither true nor false; hence this and only this sentence creates the Pinocchio (liar) paradox.

== History ==
Pinocchio is a hero of the 1883 children's novel The Adventures of Pinocchio by Italian author Carlo Collodi. Pinocchio, an animated puppet, is punished for each lie that he tells by undergoing further growth of his nose. There are no restrictions on the length of Pinocchio's nose. It grows as he tells lies and at one point grows so long that he can not even get his nose "through the door of the room".

The Pinocchio paradox was proposed in February 2001 by 11-year-old Veronique Eldridge-Smith. Veronique is the daughter of Peter Eldridge-Smith, who specializes in logic and the philosophy of logic. Peter Eldridge-Smith explained the liar paradox to Veronique and Veronique's older brother and asked the children to come up with their own versions of the famous paradox. In a few minutes, Veronique suggested: "Pinocchio says, 'My nose will be growing'." Eldridge-Smith liked the formulation of the paradox suggested by his daughter and wrote an article on the subject. The article was published in the journal Analysis, and the Pinocchio paradox became popularized on the Internet.

== The paradox ==
The paradox suggested by Veronique, "My nose grows now", or in future tense: "will be growing", leaves room for different interpretations. In the novel, Pinocchio's nose continues to grow as he lies: "As he spoke, his nose, long though it was, became at least two inches longer." So logicians question if the sentence "My nose will be growing" was the only sentence that Pinocchio spoke, did he tell a lie before he said "My nose will be growing", or was he going to tell a lie—and how long would it take for his nose to start growing?

The present tense of the same sentence "My nose is growing now" or "My nose grows", appears to provide a better opportunity to generate the liar paradox.

The sentence "My nose grows" could be either true or false.

Assume the sentence: "My nose grows now" is true:

- Which means that Pinocchio's nose does not grow now because he truthfully says it is, but then
- Pinocchio's nose does not grow now because according to the novel it grows only as Pinocchio lies, but then
- Pinocchio's nose grows now because Pinocchio's nose does not grow now, and Pinocchio truthfully says it grows now, and it is false, that makes Pinocchio's sentence to be false, but then
- Pinocchio's nose does not grow now because Pinocchio's nose grows now, and Pinocchio truthfully says it grows now, and it is true that makes Pinocchio's sentence true, but then
- And so on without end.

Assume the sentence: "My nose grows now" is false:

- Which means that Pinocchio's nose does not grow now because he falsely says it is, but then
- Pinocchio's nose does grow now because according to the novel it grows only as Pinocchio lies, but then
- Pinocchio's nose does not grow now because Pinocchio's nose grows now, and Pinocchio falsely says it grows now, and it is false, that makes Pinocchio's sentence true, but then
- Pinocchio's nose grows now because Pinocchio's nose does not grow now, and Pinocchio falsely says it grows now, and it is true, that makes Pinocchio's sentence to be false, but then
- And so on without end.

And just to make it easier, as Eldridge-Smith states, "Pinocchio's nose is growing if and only if it is not growing," which makes Pinocchio's sentence to be "a version of the Liar".

Eldridge-Smith argues that because the phrases "is not true" and "is growing" are not synonyms, the Pinocchio paradox is not a semantic paradox:

The Pinocchio paradox is, in a way, a counterexample to solutions to the Liar that would exclude semantic predicates from an object–language, because "is growing" is not a semantic predicate.

Eldridge-Smith believes Alfred Tarski's theory, in which he states that liar paradoxes should be diagnosed as arising only in languages that are "semantically closed". By this he means a language in which it is possible for one sentence to predicate the truth (or falsehood) of a sentence in the same language should not be applied to the Pinocchio paradox:

The Pinocchio paradox raises a purely logical issue for any metalanguage–hierarchy solution, strict or liberal. The Pinocchio scenario is not going to arise in our world, so it is not a pragmatic issue. It seems though that there could be a logically possible world in which Pinocchio's nose grows if and only if he is saying something not true. However, there cannot be such a logically possible world wherein he makes the statement "My nose is growing." A metalanguage hierarchy approach cannot explain this based on Tarski's analysis, and therefore cannot solve the Pinocchio paradox, which is a version of the Liar.

In his next article, "Pinocchio against the dialetheists", Eldridge-Smith states: "If it is a true contradiction that Pinocchio's nose grows and does not grow, then such a world is metaphysically impossible, not merely semantically impossible." He then reminds the readers that, when (in Buridan's bridge) Socrates asked if he may cross a bridge, Plato responded that he may cross the bridge only "if in the first proposition that you would utter you speak the truth. But surely, if you speak falsely I shall throw you into the water." Socrates replied, "You are going to throw me into the water." Socrates's response is a sophism that puts Plato in a difficult situation. He could not throw Socrates into the water, because by doing this Plato would have violated his promise to let Socrates cross the bridge if he speaks the truth. On the other hand, if Plato would have allowed Socrates to cross the bridge, it would have meant that Socrates said an untruth when he replied "You are going to throw me into the water," and he, therefore, should have been thrown into the water. In other words, Socrates could be allowed to cross the bridge if and only if he could not be.

== Solutions ==
=== Future tense ===
William F. Vallicella, while admitting that he has not read the articles published in Analysis, says that he does not see a paradox in the future tense of the sentence "My nose will grow now", or in the present tense of the sentence "My nose grows now".

Vallicella argues that the future tense sentence cannot generate the liar paradox because this sentence cannot be ever treated as a falsity. He explains his point with this example: "Suppose I predict that tomorrow morning, at 6 AM, my blood pressure will be 125/75, but my prediction turns out false: my blood pressure the next morning is 135/85. No one who heard my prediction could claim that I lied when I made it even if I had the intention of deceiving my hearers. For although I made (what turned out to be) a false statement with the intention to deceive, I had no way of knowing exactly what my blood pressure would be the next day." The same explanation could be used to explain Pinocchio's sentence. Even if his prediction that his nose will grow turns out to be false, it is impossible to claim that he has lied. Then Vallicella explains why he does not see the liar paradox in Pinocchio's sentence if the present tense is used:

If Pinocchio says 'My nose grows now,' he is either lying or not. If he is lying, then he is making a false statement, which implies that his nose does not grow now. If he is not lying, then his statement is either true or false, which implies that either his nose does grow now or his nose does not grow now. Therefore, either his nose does not grow now or his nose does grow now. But that is wholly unproblematic.

However, Vallicella's argument can be criticized in the following way: Unlike Pinocchio, Vallicella's blood pressure does not respond to the veracity of his own statements. However, Pinocchio, operating within the framework of having observed that his nose grows when and only when he lies, would be making an inductively reasoned statement which he believes to be true based on his past experiences.

But this critique to Vallicella's argument can also be challenged. Based on Pinocchio's own presumed understanding of the nature of when and why his nose grows, "my nose grows now" can only have been 'inductively reasoned' if Pinocchio was referring to a lie that he stated right beforehand. For Pinocchio, "my nose grows now" is a statement that merely serves to imply that whatever he said right before was a lie and that therefore his nose will probably be growing now because of that lie. In this context, the statement "my nose grows now" is a prediction or an 'educated' guess, which in its nature cannot be construed as a truth. Thus, whether or not his nose grows now would solely depend on what he said after "my nose grows now".

== See also ==
- Liar paradox
- List of paradoxes
