= Barbershop paradox =

Logical paradox

The barbershop paradox was proposed by Lewis Carroll in a three-page essay titled "A Logical Paradox", which appeared in the July 1894 issue of Mind. The name comes from the "ornamental" short story that Carroll uses in the article to illustrate the paradox. It existed previously in several alternative forms in his writing and correspondence, not always involving a barbershop. Carroll described it as illustrating "a very real difficulty in the Theory of Hypotheticals". From the viewpoint of modern logic, it is seen not so much as a paradox than as a simple logical error. It is of interest now mainly as an episode in the development of algebraic logical methods when these were not so widely understood (even among logicians), although the problem continues to be discussed in relation to theories of implication and modal logic.

== The paradox ==
In the story, Uncle Joe and Uncle Jim are walking to the barber shop. They explain that there are three barbers who live and work in the shop—Allen, Brown, and Carr—and some or all of them may be in. We are given two pieces of information from which to draw conclusions. Firstly, the shop is definitely open, so at least one of the barbers must be in. Secondly, Allen is said to be very nervous, so that he always brings Brown with him wherever he goes.

Now, according to Uncle Jim, Carr is a very good barber, and he wants to know whether Carr will be there to shave him. Uncle Joe insists that Carr is certain to be in, and claims that he can prove it logically. Uncle Jim demands this proof.

Uncle Joe gives his argument as follows:

Suppose that Carr is out. We will show that this assumption produces a contradiction. If Carr is out, then we know this: "If Allen is out, then Brown is in", because there has to be someone in "to mind the shop." But, we also know that whenever Allen goes out he takes Brown with him, so as a general rule, "If Allen is out, then Brown is out". The two statements we have arrived at are incompatible, because if Allen is out then Brown cannot be both In (according to one) and Out (according to the other). There is a contradiction. So we must abandon our hypothesis that Carr is Out, and conclude that Carr must be in.

Uncle Jim's response is that this conclusion is not warranted. The correct conclusion to draw from the incompatibility of the two "hypotheticals" is that what is hypothesized in them (that Allen is out) must be false under our assumption that Carr is out. Then our logic simply allows us to arrive at the conclusion "If Carr is out, then Allen must necessarily be in".

== Origin ==
The paradox arose out of a disagreement between Carroll and his Oxford colleague, Wykeham Professor of Logic John Cook Wilson, the two of whom had a long-running antagonism. The problem was also discussed by others with whom Carroll corresponded, and was addressed in later articles published by John Venn, Alfred Sidgwick and Bertrand Russell among others. Cook Wilson's view is represented in the story by the character of Uncle Joe, who attempts to prove that Carr must always remain in the shop. Others had taken the same view when Carroll circulated his privately printed versions of the problem. As Carroll noted, "I am in correspondence with about a dozen logicians on this curious point; & so far, opinions appear equally divided as to C's freedom".

== Simplification ==
=== Notation ===
When reading the original it may help to keep the following in mind:

- What Carroll called "hypotheticals" modern logicians call "logical conditionals".
- Uncle Joe concludes his proof reductio ad absurdum, meaning in English "proof by contradiction".
- What Carroll calls the protasis of a conditional is now known as the antecedent, and similarly the apodosis is now called the consequent.

Symbols can be used to greatly simplify logical statements such as those inherent in this story:

| Operator (Name) | Colloquial | | Symbolic | |
|---|---|---|---|---|
| Negation | NOT | not X | ¬ | ¬X |
| Conjunction | AND | X and Y | ∧ | X ∧ Y |
| Disjunction | OR | X or Y | ∨ | X ∨ Y |
| Conditional | IF ... THEN | if X then Y | ⇒ | X ⇒ Y |

Note: X ⇒ Y (also known as "Implication") can be read many ways in English, from "X is sufficient for Y" to "Y follows from X".

=== Restatement ===
To aid in restating Carroll's story more simply, we will take the following atomic statements:

- A = Allen is in the shop
- B = Brown is in
- C = Carr is in

So, for instance (¬A ∧ B) represents "Allen is out and Brown is in"

Uncle Jim gives us our two axioms:

1. There is at least one barber in the shop now (A ∨ B ∨ C)
2. Allen never leaves the shop without Brown (¬A ⇒ ¬B)

Uncle Joe presents a proof:

| Abbreviated English with logical markers | Mainly Symbolic |
|---|---|
| Suppose Carr is NOT in. | H0: ¬C |
| Given NOT C, IF Allen is NOT in THEN Brown must be in, to satisfy Axiom 1(A1). | By H0 and A1, ¬A ⇒ B |
| But Axiom 2(A2) gives that it is universally true that IF Allen is Not in THEN Brown is Not in (it is always true that if ¬A then ¬B) | By A2, ¬A ⇒ ¬B |
| So far we have that NOT C yields both (Not A THEN B) AND (Not A THEN Not B). | Thus ¬C ⇒ ( (¬A ⇒ B) ∧ (¬A ⇒ ¬B) ) |
| Uncle Joe claims that these are contradictory. | ⊥ |
| Therefore, Carr must be in. | ∴C |

Uncle Joe basically makes the argument that (¬A ⇒ B) and (¬A ⇒ ¬B) are contradictory, saying that the same antecedent cannot result in two different consequents.

This purported contradiction is the crux of Joe's "proof". Carroll presents this intuition-defying result as a paradox, hoping that the contemporary ambiguity would be resolved.

== Discussion ==
In modern logic theory this scenario is not a paradox. The law of implication reconciles what Uncle Joe claims are incompatible hypotheticals. This law states that "if X then Y" is logically identical to "X is false or Y is true" (¬X ∨ Y). For example, given the statement "if you press the button then the light comes on", it must be true at any given moment that either you have not pressed the button, or the light is on.

In short, what obtains is not that ¬C yields a contradiction, only that it necessitates A, because ¬A is what actually yields the contradiction.

In this scenario, that means Carr doesn't have to be in, but that if he isn't in, Allen has to be in.

=== Simplifying to Axiom 1 ===
Applying the law of implication to the offending conditionals shows that rather than contradicting each other one simply reiterates the fact that since the shop is open one or more of Allen, Brown or Carr is in and the other puts very little restriction on who can or cannot be in the shop.

To see this let's attack Jim's large "contradictory" result, mainly by applying the law of implication repeatedly. First let's break down one of the two offending conditionals:

| "If Allen is out, then Brown is out" "Allen is in or Brown is out" | (¬A ⇒ ¬B) (A ∨ ¬B) |

Substituting this into

| "IF Carr is out, THEN If Allen is also out Then Brown is in AND If Allen is out Then Brown is out." | ¬C ⇒ ( (¬A ⇒ B) ∧ (¬A ⇒ ¬B) ) |

Which yields, with continued application of the law of implication,

| "IF Carr is out, THEN if Allen is also out, Brown is in AND either Allen is in OR Brown is out." "IF Carr is out, THEN both of these are true: Allen is in OR Brown is in AND Allen is in OR Brown is out." "Carr is in OR both of these are true: Allen is in OR Brown is in AND Allen is in OR Brown is out." | ¬C ⇒ ( (¬A ⇒ B) ∧ (A ∨ ¬B) ) ¬C ⇒ ( (A ∨ B) ∧ (A ∨ ¬B) ) C ∨ ( (A ∨ B) ∧ (A ∨ ¬B) ) |

  - note that : C ∨ ( (A ∨ B) ∧ (A ∨ ¬B) ) can be simplified to C ∨ A
  - since ( (A ∨ B) ∧ (A ∨ ¬B) ) is simply A

And finally, (on the right we are distributing over the parentheses)

| "Carr is in OR Either Allen is in OR Brown is in, AND Carr is in OR Either Allen is in OR Brown is out." "Inclusively, Carr is in OR Allen is in OR Brown is in, AND Inclusively, Carr is in OR Allen is in OR Brown is out." | C ∨ (A ∨ B) ∧ C ∨ (A ∨ ¬B) (C ∨ A ∨ B) ∧ (C ∨ A ∨ ¬B) |

So the two statements which become true at once are: "One or more of Allen, Brown or Carr is in", which is simply Axiom 1, and "Carr is in or Allen is in or Brown is out". Clearly one way that both of these statements can become true at once is in the case where Allen is in (because Allen's house is the barber shop, and at some point Brown left the shop).

Another way to describe how (X ⇒ Y) ⇔ (¬X ∨ Y) resolves this into a valid set of statements is to rephrase Jim's statement that "If Allen is also out ..." into "If Carr is out and Allen is out then Brown is in" ( (¬C ∧ ¬A) ⇒ B).

=== Showing conditionals compatible ===
The two conditionals are not logical opposites: to prove by contradiction Jim needed to show ¬C ⇒ (Z ∧ ¬Z), where Z happens to be a conditional.

The opposite of (A ⇒ B) is ¬(A ⇒ B), which, using De Morgan's Law, resolves to (A ∧ ¬B), which is not at all the same thing as (¬A ∨ ¬B), which is what A ⇒ ¬B reduces to.

This confusion about the "compatibility" of these two conditionals was foreseen by Carroll, who includes a mention of it at the end of the story. He attempts to clarify the issue by arguing that the protasis and apodosis of the implication "If Carr is in ..." are "incorrectly divided". However, application of the Law of Implication removes the "If ..." entirely (reducing to disjunctions), so no protasis and apodosis exist and no counter-argument is needed.

== See also ==
- Conditional sentences in English
- Crocodile dilemma
- List of paradoxes
- Russell's paradox
