= Paradox of the Court =

Paradox originating in ancient Greece

The Paradox of the Court, also known as the counterdilemma of Euathlus or Protagoras' paradox, is a paradox originating in ancient Greece.

The story is related by the Latin author Aulus Gellius in Attic Nights, who says that the famous sophist Protagoras took on a promising pupil, Euathlus, on the understanding that the student pay Protagoras for his instruction after he wins his first court case. After instruction, Euathlus decided to not enter the profession of law, but to enter politics instead, and so Protagoras decided to sue Euathlus for the amount he is owed. Protagoras argued that if he won the case, he would be paid his money. If Euathlus won the case, Protagoras would still be paid according to the original contract, because Euathlus would have won his first case. Euathlus, however, claimed that if he won, then by the court's decision he would not have to pay Protagoras. If, on the other hand, Protagoras won, then Euathlus would still not have won a case and would therefore not be obliged to pay. The question is then, which of the two men is in the right?

Gellius concludes:

Then the jurors, thinking that the plea on both sides was uncertain and insoluble, for fear that their decision, for whichever side it was rendered, might annul itself, left the matter undecided and postponed the case to a distant day. Thus a celebrated master of oratory was refuted by his youthful pupil with his own argument, and his cleverly devised sophism failed.

== See also ==
- List of paradoxes
- Subject-matter jurisdiction
