= Barber paradox =

Colloquial version of Russell's paradox

The barber paradox is a puzzle derived from Russell's paradox. It was suggested to Bertrand Russell as an illustration of the paradox, but he deemed it an invalid modification of his paradox. The puzzle shows that an apparently plausible scenario is logically impossible. Specifically, it describes a barber who is defined such that he both shaves himself and does not shave himself, which implies that no such barber exists.

== Paradox ==
The barber is the "one who shaves all those, and those only, who do not shave themselves". The question is, does the barber shave himself?

Any answer to this question results in a contradiction:

1. The barber cannot shave himself, as he only shaves those who do not shave themselves. Thus, if he shaves himself he ceases to be the barber specified.
2. Conversely, if the barber does not shave himself, then he fits into the group of people whom the specified barber would shave, and thus, as that barber, he must shave himself.

In its original form, this paradox has no solution, as no such barber can exist. The question is a loaded question in that it assumes the existence of a barber who could not exist, which is a vacuous proposition, and hence false. There are other non-paradoxical variations, but those are different.

== History ==
This paradox is often incorrectly attributed to Bertrand Russell (e.g., by Martin Gardner in Aha!). It was suggested to Russell as an alternative form of Russell's paradox, which Russell had devised to show that set theory as it was used by Georg Cantor and Gottlob Frege contained contradictions. However, Russell denied that the Barber's paradox was an instance of his own:

That contradiction [Russell's paradox] is extremely interesting. You can modify its form; some forms of modification are valid and some are not. I once had a form suggested to me which was not valid, namely the question whether the barber shaves himself or not. You can define the barber as "one who shaves all those, and those only, who do not shave themselves". The question is, does the barber shave himself? In this form the contradiction is not very difficult to solve. But in our previous form I think it is clear that you can only get around it by observing that the whole question whether a class is or is not a member of itself is nonsense, i.e. that no class either is or is not a member of itself, and that it is not even true to say that, because the whole form of words is just noise without meaning.

— Bertrand Russell, The Philosophy of Logical Atomism

This point is elaborated further under Applied versions of Russell's paradox.

== In first-order logic ==
$$(\exists x ) (\text{person}(x) \wedge (\forall y) (\text{person}(y) \implies (\text{shaves}(x, y)  \iff \neg \text{shaves}(y, y))))$$

This sentence says that a barber x exists. Its truth value is false, as the existential clause is unsatisfiable (a contradiction) because of the universal quantifier $(\forall)$. The universally quantified y will include every single element in the domain, including our infamous barber x. So when the value x is assigned to y, the sentence in the universal quantifier can be rewritten to $\text{shaves}(x,x)\iff \neg \text{shaves}(x,x)$, which is an instance of the contradiction $a \iff \neg a$. Since the sentence is false for the biconditional, the entire universal clause is false. Since the existential clause is a conjunction with one operand that is false, the entire sentence is false. Another way to show this is to negate the entire sentence and arrive at a tautology. Nobody is such a barber, so there is no solution to the paradox.

$$(\exists x ) (\text{person}(x) \wedge \bot)$$
$$(\exists x ) (\bot)$$
$$\bot$$

== See also ==
- Cantor's theorem
- Gödel's incompleteness theorems
- Halting problem
- List of paradoxes
- Self-reference
- List of self–referential paradoxes
- Double bind
- Principle of explosion
