= Two capacitor paradox =

Thought experiment in physics

The two capacitor paradox or capacitor paradox is a paradox, or counterintuitive thought experiment, in electric circuit theory. The thought experiment is usually described as follows:

Circuit of the paradox, showing initial voltages before the switch is closed

Two identical capacitors are connected in parallel with an open switch between them. One of the capacitors is charged with a voltage of $V_i$, the other is uncharged. When the switch is closed, some of the charge $Q = CV_i$ on the first capacitor flows into the second, reducing the voltage on the first and increasing the voltage on the second. When a steady state is reached and the current goes to zero, the voltage on the two capacitors must be equal since they are connected together. Since they both have the same capacitance $C$ the charge will be divided equally between the capacitors so each capacitor will have a charge of ${Q \over 2}$ and a voltage of $V_f = {Q \over 2C} = {V_i \over 2}$.

At the beginning of the experiment the total initial energy $W_i$ in the circuit is the energy stored in the charged capacitor:

$W_i = {1 \over 2}CV_i^2$

At the end of the experiment the final energy $W_f$ is equal to the sum of the energy in the two capacitors:

$W_f = {1 \over 2}CV_f^2 + {1 \over 2}CV_f^2 = CV_f^2 = C\left({V_i \over 2}\right)^2 = {1 \over 4}CV_i^2 = {1 \over 2}W_i$

Thus the final energy $W_f$ is equal to half of the initial energy $W_i$. The paradox lies in the unexplained loss of the remainder half of the initial energy: an apparent violation of the law of conservation of energy.

== Solutions ==
This problem has been discussed in electronics literature at least as far back as 1955. Unlike some other paradoxes in science, this paradox is not due to the underlying physics, but to the limitations of the 'ideal circuit' conventions used in circuit theory. The description specified above is not physically realizable if the circuit is assumed to be made of ideal circuit elements, as is usual in circuit theory. If the series resistance of the wires and conductors in the circuit is $R$, the initial current when the switch is closed is

$$i(0) = {V_\text{i} \over R}$$

If the wires connecting the two capacitors, the switch, and the capacitors themselves are idealized as having no electrical resistance or inductance as is usual, then closing the switch would connect points at different voltage with a perfect conductor, causing an infinite current to flow, which is impossible. Therefore a solution requires that one or more of the 'ideal' characteristics of the elements in the circuit be relaxed, which was not specified in the above description. The solution differs depending on which of the assumptions about the actual characteristics of the circuit elements is abandoned:

- If the connecting wires are assumed to have any nonzero resistance at all, it is an RC circuit, and the current will decrease exponentially to zero. Since none of the original charge is lost, the final state of the capacitors will be as described above, with half the initial voltage on each capacitor. Since in this state the two capacitors together are left with half the energy, regardless of the amount of resistance half of the initial energy will be dissipated as heat in the wire resistance.
- If the wires are assumed to have inductance but no resistance, the current will not be infinite, but the circuit does not have any energy dissipating components, so it will not settle to a steady state, as assumed in the description. It will constitute an LC circuit with no damping, so the charge will oscillate perpetually back and forth between the two capacitors; the voltage on the two capacitors and the current will vary sinusoidally. None of the initial energy will be lost, at any point the sum of the energy in the two capacitors and the energy stored in the magnetic field around the wires will equal the initial energy.
- If the connecting wires, in addition to having inductance and no resistance, are assumed to have a nonzero length, the oscillating circuit will act as an antenna and lose energy by radiating electromagnetic waves (radio waves). The effect of this energy loss is exactly the same as if there were a resistance called the radiation resistance in the circuit, so the circuit will be equivalent to an RLC circuit. The oscillating current in the wires will be an exponentially decaying sinusoid. Since none of the original charge is lost, the final state of the capacitors will be as in the case of the resistor, with half the initial voltage on each. Since in this state the capacitors contain half the initial energy, the missing half of the energy will have been radiated away by the electromagnetic waves.
- If in addition to nonzero length and inductance the wires are assumed to have resistance, the total energy loss will be the same, half the initial energy, but will be divided between the radiated electromagnetic waves and heat dissipated in the resistance.

Various additional solutions have been devised, based on more detailed assumptions about the characteristics of the components.

== Alternate versions ==
There are several alternate versions of the paradox. One is the original circuit with the two capacitors initially charged with equal and opposite voltages $+V_i$ and $-V_i$. Another equivalent version is a single charged capacitor short circuited by a perfect conductor. In these cases in the final state the entire charge has been neutralized, the final voltage on the capacitors is zero, so the entire initial energy has vanished. The solutions to where the energy went are similar to those described in the previous section.

== See also ==
- List of paradoxes
