= Paradox of prosperity =

Paradox of prosperity is a term used widely in many instances in economics, social theory and general commentary. In inter-generational analysis, Professor Gilbert N. M. O. Morris defines the term through an analysis of the familial dynamics and social proclivities of what Tom Brokaw has called the "Greatest Generation". Morris argues that:

"A paradox of prosperity is revealed and shown to be stable in the cycles of economic advancement between generations. I would put the matter this way: If one accepts, for example, that Mr. Brokaw's 'Greatest Generation' were characterised by prudence, diligence, and patriotism in deed rather than word, that very generation produced its opposite in the generation that followed it. That is to say, I have found it repeated across the ages and across cultures, that the more diligent a previous generation, as a natural propensity, the more licentious the generation that follows. Invariably therefore, the generation that exhibits the more cogent properties of character for the best sort of citizenship fails to produce a generation of the same or similar characteristics."

== General terms ==
"Paradox of Prosperity" was applied as a term of analysis in the 2011 New York Times and Wall Street Journal bestseller Rescue America: Our best America is only one generation away, which Professor Morris co-authored with Chris Salamone. There, the inter-generational breakdown is given a fuller exposition. Morris, who has been a careful reader of Thorstein Veblen, particularly Veblen's book The Theory of the Leisure Class, says his own advancement of this inter-generational thesis was influenced by Veblen. "I think", said Morris, "Veblen gave some insight as to what is produced in the generation which follows one such as Tom Brokaw described. The Greatest Generations - if by that we mean a generation characterised by prudence and sacrifice - nearly always produces a generation which can be characterised as a leisure class. They consume without manufacturing. They project feelings over principles. In general terms, they lack a spirit of sacrifice because they abhor the notion of "Objective Values" and so lack the will to re-create or advance the social ethos created by their parent's generation." In cultural terms, the generation that followed the "Greatest Generation" were the baby boomers (essentially, the children of the Greatest Generation between 1945–1965). The "Boomers" fit the classic definition of a "leisure class", which Veblen described as being characterised by Conspicuous Consumption. Morris extends Veblen's notion of the 'leisure class, saying: "It is ultimately not a question of economic utility which underlines the idea of conspicuous consumption. It is rather consumption as a lack of restraint or prudence in all things; with an isometric emphasis driven by a gyroscopic self-indulgence. It is to think, feel or defend this absence of restraint as a concept of life, which is today everywhere, it seems, extant."

== Specific terms ==
In Rescue America, Salamone and Morris argue the parents of the leisure class (the baby boomers) were prudential but also understandably aspirational. They wanted better for their children than they had. This gave license to a new imprudence characterised by an attitude of entitlement and a culture of complaint. (See also: The Culture of Complaint by Robert Hughes, which also influenced Morris's account of prosperity as paradoxical). In his recent book Bahama Modes: Notes Toward a Definition of Culture, Professor Morris says the following: "It is quite difficult to press a label upon an entire generation. However, one speaks of the 'paradox of prosperity' in specific terms as a thesis. That is to say, one finds lines of development which possess explanatory potency for the habitudes of people with certain generational similarities. Then what we discover is a disposition in politics, in organizational culture, the literary productions and in the culture at large. Salamone and I examined such questions in Rescue America. From that disposition, such generations as I have described, which have had no experience of unassignable routine sacrifice, reveal a tendency, which may be summed in his way: they move values toward behavior, rather than behavior toward values".

== See also ==
- List of paradoxes
