= Paradox of nihilism =

Several philosophical paradoxes

The paradox of nihilism is a family of paradoxes regarding the philosophical implications of nihilism, particularly situations contesting nihilist perspectives on the nature and extent of subjectivity within a nihilist framework. There are a number of variations of this paradox.

== Overview ==
While there are several derivative examples of the paradox of nihilism, they generally fall on the lines that nihilism itself has drawn to demarcate different sections of the philosophy. The two basic paradoxes are reflective of the philosophies of nihilism that created them; metaphysical nihilism and existential nihilism. Both paradoxes originate from the same conceptual difficulty of whether, as Paul Hegarty writes in his study of noise music, "the absence of meaning seems to be some sort of meaning".

=== Metaphysical nihilism ===
Metaphysical nihilism is based around skepticism that concrete objects, and the self which perceives them, actually exist as concrete objects rather than as abstract objects. It is not a far stretch, in the framework of this theory, to assume that these objects do not exist at all. The philosophy can most concisely be summed up using the model proposed by British philosopher Thomas Baldwin in his 1996 paper on the subject which is referred to as subtraction theory. It holds that for a possible world with finite objects, any one or more of those objects may not have existed, and their non-existence does not mean that something equivalent exists in their place. Therefore, it is entirely possible that a world with no objects exists.

The paradox arises from the logical assertion that if no concrete or abstract objects exist, even the self, then that very concept itself would be untrue because it itself exists. Critics often point to the ambiguity of Baldwin's premises as proof both of the paradox and of the flaws within metaphysical nihilism itself. The main point made argues that a world is itself a concrete object, and whether it exists or does not exist is irrelevant because in both instances it would disprove subtraction theory. In the case of its existence, subtraction theory fails because there is still a concrete object; if the world does not exist, subtraction theory fails because the truth of the world is revealed via subtraction theory, which itself exists, and therefore negates Baldwin's conclusion that a world with no objects can exist.

=== Existential nihilism ===
Existential nihilism is the philosophical theory that life has no inherent meaning whatsoever, and that humanity, both in an individual sense and in a collective sense, has no purpose. That is to say: while objects have the capacity for purpose or meaning, there is no universal truth that guides this individual purpose. Thus, without a universal purpose, all meaning that objects could have does not exist, and the idea of any purpose or meaning attributed to something is untrue. If this is taken as a given, then existential nihilism holds that humans are compelled to make up meaning for themselves and others in the absence of a universal, unilateral meaning in order to spare themselves from the negativity surrounding the inevitability of death. Existential nihilism explores both the nature of this invention and the effectiveness of creating meaning for oneself and others, as well as whether the latter is even possible. It has received the most attention out of all forms of nihilism in both literary and popular media.

=== Ethical nihilism ===
According to Jonna Bornemark, "the paradox of nihilism is the choice to continue one's own life while at the same time stating that it is not worth more than any other life". Richard Ian Wright sees relativism as the root of the paradox.

== See also ==
- List of paradoxes
- Nihilism
- Relativism
