= European paradox =

Social phenomenon

The European paradox is the perceived failure of European countries to translate scientific advances into marketable innovations. The term was coined in a European Commission Green Paper in 1995. Recently, several articles questioned both the theoretical interpretation upon which the paradox conjecture is based and its empirical underpinnings.

== Other countries ==
The phenomenon of having a well-educated workforce with strong academia, while trailing in commercialization of technology is also frequently bemoaned in Australia. There the cause is frequently attributed to high taxation, low government industry support and general anti-intellectualism. A key difference is population size, as Australia is constrained by a very small domestic market, while Europe is not.

== See also ==
- List of paradoxes
