= Status paradox =

A status paradox can be one of several paradoxes involving "status", in the meaning of either medical state or social status.

== Status paradox of migration ==
This type of status paradox describes how a migration of peoples can alter the status of these peoples, either higher or lower. It is related to economic inequality between world regions which creates incentives for transnational migrants to transfer resources earned in richer countries to poorer countries and, thereby, to gain buying power and social status.

An example is a migration of laboring migrants from poorer countries, such as Mexico, Albania or Ghana. Their ability to work is considered qualified by the standards of their home country, but is much diminished in the new country they come to. This causes their social status to drop in their new country of living, while their level of education or training held them in a higher social circle in their country of origin. This type of status inconsistency creates the paradox of the migrants being qualified for two different social classes at the same time, but they can only use each class if they are within the boundaries of where it is relevant. Because of global inequalities in terms of wealth and buying power transnational migrants to which the status paradox applies challenge local middle classes in the sending countries. In several countries of the global south names have emerged to classify these migrants, such as Burgers (Ghana), Bengiste (Côte d'Ivoire) or Modou Modou (Senegal).

== Wealth and HIV status paradox ==
For higher classes with greater amount of wealth, it is naturally assumed that they will have less of a chance of acquiring infectious diseases because they have the money to stop the spread of such diseases. Meanwhile, lower classes with less wealth will not be able to afford treatments to stop the spread of diseases and might even not be knowledgeable about dangerous diseases that they might be catching, so they are at a higher likelihood of catching and spreading various diseases.

However, this is not the case in Africa with HIV. The upper class, instead, are the ones that have the highest percentage of HIV infection, specifically 15- to 29-year-olds. This creates a type of status paradox, having a "disease of affluence", associated with differing class levels.

== Gender and status paradox ==
Gender, within the realm of economics and business, has long been a dividing factor in terms of wages and management. The use of humor by women in management is one method of relieving the tension created from women being in charge over men, which is seen as a status paradox.

== Lifestyle-health status paradox ==
For people in the United States, obesity has been a growing trend. The formation of a healthy lifestyle is a viewpoint that is generally not attributed to Americans. From such increases in weight, diabetes, asthma, and migraines have grown more common. However, offsetting this somewhat, the number of people contracting cardiovascular disease and other chronic diseases has been dropping for the age range of Americans that are at a higher likelihood of being obese. This status paradox does not correlate with the evidence that shows such rates should be increasing, not decreasing.

== See also ==
- List of paradoxes
