= Opposite Day =

Children's game

Opposite Day is a make believe game usually played by children. Conceptually, Opposite Day is a holiday where things are said and done in an opposite manner. It is not a holiday on any calendar and therefore one can declare that any day of the year is Opposite Day (sometimes retroactively) to indicate something which will be said, or has just been said should be understood opposite to its original meaning (similar to the practice of crossed fingers to automatically nullify promises). Opposite Day is an example of a paradox; declaring Opposite Day is a self-contradiction meaning that it is in fact not Opposite Day but is at the same time.

== Game mechanics ==
Despite the name, Opposite Day does not necessarily last for one 24-hour calendar day. Opposite Day begins when someone declares it to be Opposite Day, and ends whenever they stop. Participants often need to use reverse psychology and antonyms in order to effectively communicate. People will say one thing when it means another.

== In childhood development ==
The game has also been compared to a children's "philosophy course" in the way that it encourages children to think. While certain things have clear and very obvious opposites, such as "yes" and "no" or "black" and "white", anything outside of a clear binary can be hard to find clear opposites for. For instance, what is the opposite of ice cream? What is the opposite of taking a bath?

When a child is learning about opposites, they are learning skills they will use in math, science, and reading. In language therapy, opposites or antonyms might be addressed because they help grow vocabulary, help children understand basic concepts, and enhance overall understanding of language. It is encouraged for parents to help children try to find opposites.

== See also ==
- Bizarro World
- Freaky Friday
- Childlore
- List of self–referential paradoxes
