= Solomon's paradox =

Logically self-contradictory statement

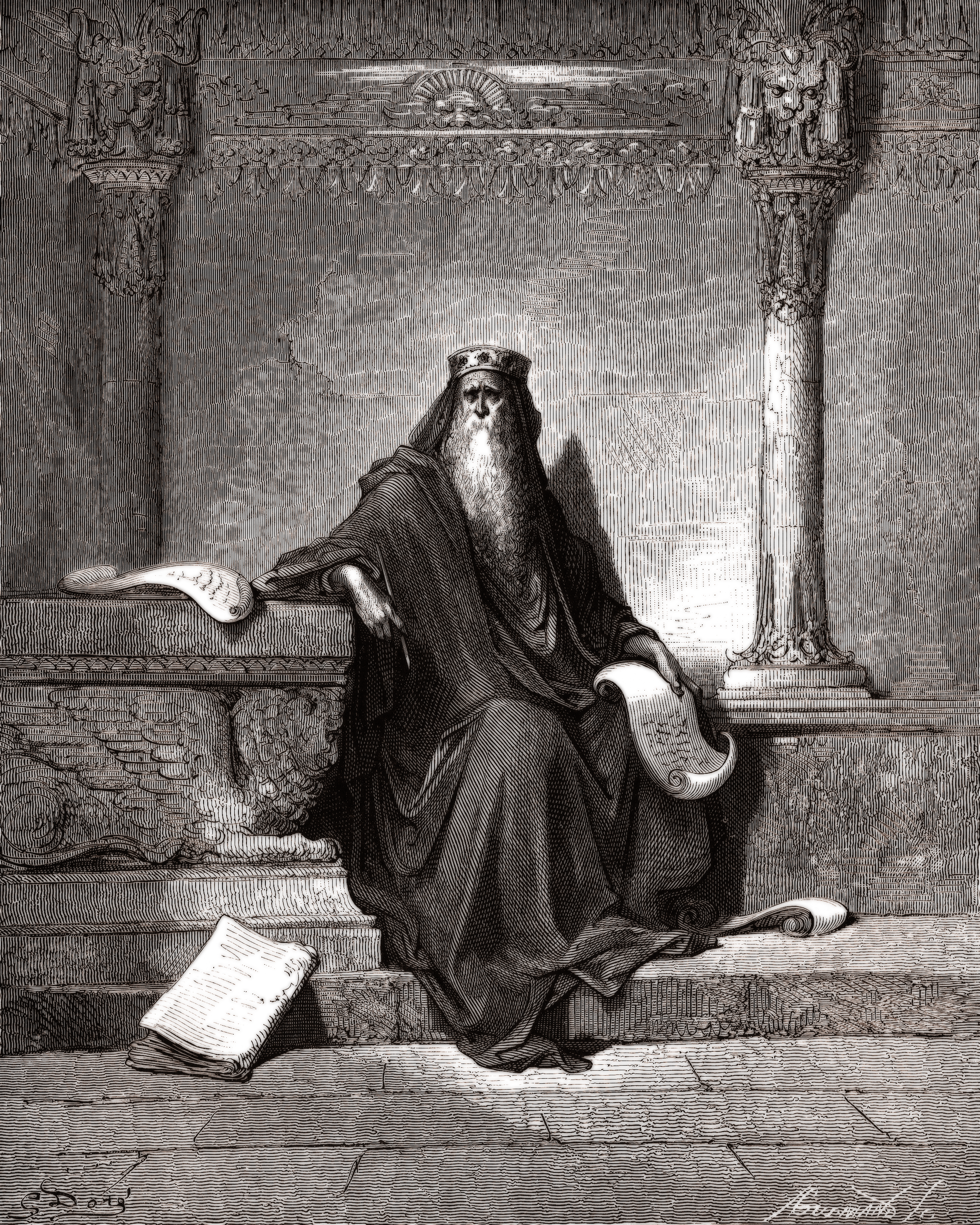
King Solomon (for whom the paradox is named)

Solomon's paradox is the observation that people can give reasonable advice to others, but fail to apply this advice to their own situation.

This phenomenon has to do with the intersection of self-distance and wisdom in social decisions. The concept of self-distancing is tightly linked with Solomon's paradox as it represents the psychological process by which a person separates their sense of self from an emotionally charged situation in order to reason about it more clearly. Wisdom is defined as a form of pragmatic reasoning that helps people successfully navigate the everyday challenges and conflicts of social life. Solomon's paradox itself refers to the phenomenon where people demonstrate this wise reasoning much more effectively when dealing with other people's social problems compared to their own.

== History of term ==
The term "Solomon's paradox" originated in a study by scientists Ethan Kross and Igor Grossmann, professors of psychology at the University of Michigan and University of Waterloo, inspired by the story of King Solomon. According to legend, he was known as a wise ruler, who everyone sought advice from to settle disputes. However, the regime of King Solomon himself ended dishonourably: he had amassed great wealth by squandering the state treasury and enacting forced labour of citizens, which led to rebellions that, after his death, split the country in two. Moreover, the King's bad decisions and betrayal of religion also angered God, who in turn promised the ruler's people many hardships. Thus, the King inspired Solomon's paradox with his life: acting as a sound adviser for all but himself.

Kross and Grossmann were also influenced by Chief Judge Solomon, coincidentally of the same name, who exemplified the same irony. Some 3,000 years after King Solomon, Judge Solomon was known for his significant work in spousal abuse protection cases, yet pleaded guilty to harassing a former mistress and threatening to kidnap her daughter, which resulted in a fifteen-month prison sentence. Both these cases evidence that people demonstrate wiser, more balanced reasoning when evaluating other people's problems than when confronting their own, forming the motivation for the original study.

== Original study by Kross and Grossmann ==
Kross and Grossmann's research, where the term was first coined, featured 693 participants to test whether people's judgements of others' scenarios were wiser than when judging their own. Furthermore, the study tested whether judgement was more wise-reasoned if people engaged in self-distancing with situations. In the context of the study, wise-reasoning was measured through quantified measurable cognitive habits, including: recognising the limits of one's own knowledge, considering others' viewpoints in any given scenario, and accepting compromise. The fundamental feature underlying all these aspects of wise reasoning is that they require individuals to think beyond their egocentric perspectives.

Results confirmed Solomon's paradox through three studies; the first showing statistically significant less wise judgement when evaluating experiencing infidelity through their own lens versus judging if the same were to happen with a friend. The second and third studies built on this, encouraging participants to see scenarios through a third-person lens through description of their own actions with third-person pronouns to reduce self-immersion in social situations. Ultimately, self-distancing effectively neutralized the self-other asymmetry, allowing individuals to reason just as wisely about their own personal issues as they did about the problems of others.

== Psychological explanations ==
In line with Kross and Grossmann's research, one of the psychological reasons why Solomon's paradox occurs is due to the difference in thought processes when adopting a first-person versus third-person perspective on social issues. When dealing with a difficult personal situation, individuals typically adopt a first-person viewpoint, causing them to process information in an emotionally "hot" way that narrowly focuses on the specific information at hand. This is consistent with construal level theory, which proposes that psychological proximity—being close to a situation in a personal or emotional sense—drives low-level thinking focused on immediate details rather than the bigger picture, while psychological distance encourages high-level reasoning that considers secondary details. When a problem is one's own, psychological proximity is at its maximum, and this concreteness of thought crowds out the broader perspective required for wise reasoning.

Another theory relates to cognitive biases, namely egocentric bias, where due to prioritizing one's own perspective, judgement becomes distorted when the issue is personally relevant. This leads individuals to subconsciously prioritize their own feelings about the subject matter instead of the problems at hand, resulting in a narrower point of view and reasoning, and thus lowering the usefulness of the advice. Similar observations are also present when attempting to provide advice and solve problems for people in close proximity to the individual, such as close friends and family members, due to their importance to the individual.

This narrowing of cognition is compounded by the influence of emotion on rational judgement, which comes under the broader concept of bounded rationality. A key distinction in literature is between integral emotions—those arising directly from the situation at hand—and incidental emotions that carry over from prior experiences. Integral emotions strongly and routinely shape decision-making; for instance, a person who feels anxious about the potential outcome of a risky choice may opt for a safer alternative rather than a potentially more rewarding one. In the context of Solomon's paradox, personal conflicts reliably generate intense integral emotions that systematically skew the reasoning process away from balance and toward self-protection. In contrast, when reflecting on the problems of a friend, people naturally assume a detached, observer perspective, giving less rise to integral emotions.

Solomon's paradox also parallels theories of intention-behaviour gaps: where ideas of what one should do in any given decision are inconsistent with what one actually does. Where the intention-behaviour gap describes a failure to act in accordance with one's own values and plans, Solomon's paradox mirrors how these values are hypothesised but rarely followed through. Both theories are based on the interference of emotional investment with rational self-regulation, and how self-generated ideas are unusually difficult to apply.

== Applications ==
Acknowledging Solomon's paradox can be applied in therapy, as therapists frequently use cognitive techniques to create psychological distance between clientele and their issues. For example, linguistically switching from first-person to third-person pronouns can help reduce emotional reactivity through understanding circumstances more holistically. Increasing self-distance also has the potential to introduce new information that regulates emotion via semantic change.
