= Unexpected hanging paradox =

Thought experiment in logic

The unexpected hanging paradox or surprise test paradox is a paradox about a person's expectations about the timing of a future event which they are told will occur at an unexpected time. The paradox is variously applied to a prisoner's hanging or a surprise school test. It was first mentioned in popular media by Martin Gardner, in his "Mathematical Games" column in the March 1963 issue of the magazine Scientific American.

There is no consensus on its precise nature and consequently a canonical resolution has not been agreed on. Logical analyses focus on "truth values", for example by identifying it as paradox of self-reference. Epistemological studies of the paradox instead focus on issues relating to knowledge; for example, one interpretation reduces it to Moore's paradox. Some regard it as a "significant problem" for philosophy.

== Description ==
The paradox has been described as follows:

A judge tells a condemned prisoner that he will be hanged at noon on one weekday in the following week but that the execution will be a surprise to the prisoner. He will not know the day of the hanging until the executioner knocks on his cell door at noon that day.

Having reflected on his sentence, the prisoner draws the conclusion that he will escape from the hanging. His reasoning is in several parts. He begins by concluding that the "surprise hanging" can't be on Friday, as if he hasn't been hanged by Thursday, there is only one day left – and so it won't be a surprise if he's hanged on Friday. Since the judge's sentence stipulated that the hanging would be a surprise to him, he concludes it cannot occur on Friday.

He then reasons that the surprise hanging cannot be on Thursday either, because Friday has already been eliminated and if he hasn't been hanged by Wednesday noon, the hanging must occur on Thursday, making a Thursday hanging not a surprise either. By similar reasoning, he concludes that the hanging can also not occur on Wednesday, Tuesday or Monday. Joyfully he retires to his cell confident that the hanging will not occur at all.

The next week, the executioner knocks on the prisoner's door at noon on Wednesday – which, despite all the above, was an utter surprise to him. Everything the judge said came true.

Other versions of the paradox replace the death sentence with a surprise fire drill, examination, pop quiz, A/B test launch, a lion behind a door, or a marriage proposal.

== Logical school ==
Formulation of the judge's announcement into formal logic is made difficult by the vague meaning of the word "surprise". An attempt at formulation might be:

The prisoner will be hanged next week and the date (of the hanging) will not be deducible the night before from the assumption that the hanging will occur during the week. (A)

Given this announcement the prisoner can deduce that the hanging will not occur on the last day of the week. However, in order to reproduce the next stage of the argument, which eliminates the penultimate day of the week, the prisoner must argue that his ability to deduce, from statement (A), that the hanging will not occur on the last day, implies that a second-to-last-day hanging would not be surprising. But since the meaning of "surprising" has been restricted to not deducible from the assumption that the hanging will occur during the week instead of not deducible from statement (A), the argument is blocked.

This suggests that a better formulation would in fact be:

The prisoner will be hanged next week and its date will not be deducible the night before using this statement as an axiom. (B)

Fitch has shown that this statement can still be expressed in formal logic. Using an equivalent form of the paradox which reduces the length of the week to just two days, he proved that although self-reference is not illegitimate in all circumstances, it is in this case because the statement is self-contradictory.

== Epistemological school ==
Various epistemological formulations have been proposed that show that the prisoner's tacit assumptions about what he will know in the future, together with several plausible assumptions about knowledge, are inconsistent.

Chow (1998) provides a detailed analysis of a version of the paradox in which a surprise hanging is to take place on one of two days. Applying Chow's analysis to the case of the unexpected hanging (again with the week shortened to two days for simplicity), we start with the observation that the judge's announcement seems to affirm three things:

- S1: The hanging will occur on Monday or Tuesday.
- S2: If the hanging occurs on Monday, then the prisoner will not know on Sunday evening that it will occur on Monday.
- S3: If the hanging occurs on Tuesday, then the prisoner will not know on Monday evening that it will occur on Tuesday.

As a first step, the prisoner reasons that a scenario in which the hanging occurs on Tuesday is impossible because it leads to a contradiction: on the one hand, by S3, the prisoner would not be able to predict the Tuesday hanging on Monday evening; but on the other hand, by S1 and process of elimination, the prisoner would be able to predict the Tuesday hanging on Monday evening.

Chow's analysis points to a subtle flaw in the prisoner's reasoning. What is impossible is not a Tuesday hanging. Rather, what is impossible is a situation in which the hanging occurs on Tuesday despite the prisoner knowing on Monday evening that the judge's assertions S1, S2, and S3 are all true.

The prisoner's reasoning, which gives rise to the paradox, is able to get off the ground because the prisoner tacitly assumes that on Monday evening, he will (if he is still alive) know S1, S2, and S3 to be true. This assumption seems unwarranted on several different grounds. It may be argued that the judge's pronouncement that something is true can never be sufficient grounds for the prisoner knowing that it is true. Further, even if the prisoner knows something to be true in the present moment, unknown psychological factors may erase this knowledge in the future. Finally, Chow suggests that because the statement which the prisoner is supposed to "know" to be true is a statement about his inability to "know" certain things, there is reason to believe that the unexpected hanging paradox is simply a more intricate version of Moore's paradox. A suitable analogy can be reached by reducing the length of the week to just one day. Then the judge's sentence becomes: You will be hanged tomorrow, but you do not know that.

== See also ==
- Bottle Imp paradox
- Centipede game, the Nash equilibrium which uses a similar mechanism as its proof
- Crocodile dilemma
- Interesting number paradox
- List of paradoxes
