= Outcomes paradox =

The outcomes paradox (otherwise known as the "better prognosis hypothesis") is the observation that patients with schizophrenia in developing countries benefit much more from therapy than those in developed countries. This is surprising because the reverse holds for most diseases: "the richer and more developed the country, the better the patient outcome." The outcomes paradox came to light in the 1960s due to cross-cultural studies conducted by the World Health Organization on the outcome of severe mental disorders like schizophrenia. This paradox has become an axiom in international psychiatry since.

== Background ==
Schizophrenia is a severe, chronic disorder characterised by disturbances in thought, perception and behaviour. One way a psychiatrist can diagnose it is if an individual has experienced positive symptoms (e.g., hallucinations) and/or negative symptoms (e.g., apathy) consistently for a month. Its treatment usually involves a combination of cognitive behavioural therapy and antipsychotic medication. Although the treatment for the disorder is the same cross-culturally, treatment success rates differ cross-culturally, and this phenomenon is known as the outcomes paradox.

== Cross-cultural studies ==
=== Bottom-up research approach ===
Research into the outcomes paradox followed a bottom-up research approach whereby theories are drawn from the data collected instead of conducting research after theory construction as a means of hypothesis testing.

=== World Health Organization research ===
To produce data that could later be subject to theory construction, the World Health Organization launched two supporting international studies: the International Pilot Study of Schizophrenia (IPSS) and the Determinants of Outcomes of Severe Mental Disorders (DOSMeD).

The IPSS included 1202 patients across nine countries: three developing countries (Colombia, India and Nigeria) and six developed countries (Denmark, Taiwan, the UK, the US, the Soviet Union and Czechoslovakia). The schizophrenic patients' therapy outcomes were measured using three indicators – the percentage of time with psychosis symptoms, the degree of social impairment and the type of remission after each episode. These were quantified on a scale from one (best outcome) to seven (worst outcome). By the end of this study, India had the most success as 42% of patients reported 'best outcomes', followed by Nigeria with 33% of patients. However, the developed countries did not demonstrate such positive results as the 'best outcomes' were observed in only 17% of US patients and fewer than 10% in the other developed countries researched.

The DOSMeD study researched the outcome of therapy for schizophrenia, in 1379 patients, across ten countries (Ireland and the IPSS countries). These patients were allocated to one of nine categories depending on the severity of their disorder pre-therapy. These categories ranged from a single episode of psychotic illness followed by complete remission to persistent illness. Post-therapy findings demonstrated that developing countries had higher rates of complete recovery: 37% in developing countries compared to 15.5% in developed countries. Patients from developing countries also experienced longer periods of unimpaired social functioning than those from developed countries. Researchers at the WHO concluded that "a strong case can be made for a real, pervasive influence of a powerful factor, [that] can be referred to as 'culture', [which] influences disease."

== Theories and explanations ==
=== The role of family ===
The family milieu theory of developing countries suggests that the better outcome among these patients is attributable to sociocultural factors such as higher levels of family tolerance and a greater dependence on family members for care and support. Expressed emotion is a significant characteristic of the family milieu, and it refers to a caregiver's attitude towards the schizophrenic patient. High levels of negative emotion (e.g., hostility) expressed towards a schizophrenic individual has been found to be a significant psychosocial stressor, and it has a direct association with high relapse rates. Research has shown that the likelihood of creating such a stress-inducing environment is reduced when there are a larger number of people caring for and meeting the needs of the schizophrenic individual as there is a collective sharing of the emotional demand to ensure it is not placed onto the patient. This collectivist attitude of care is found more commonly in developing countries since there is a greater importance placed on kinship relations as well as the fact that, on average, families are larger in these countries. Hence, a key cultural difference is the level of positive family involvement, which in developing countries, is associated with improved therapy outcomes due to the reduced likelihood of relapse.

=== The role of lifestyle ===
A psychiatrist named Vikram Patel theorised that the improved therapy outcome in developing countries is due to the less rigid nature of rural life than that of developed countries. It is assumed that the disorganised rural labour markets in developing countries provide more opportunities, such as fieldwork for people with disorders or disabilities. This aids these individuals in integrating into society, reducing perceived stigmas and enabling better social inclusion, which are all thought to facilitate better therapy outcomes. Additionally, research has found that meditation practices such as yoga, which are commonplace in developing countries, reduce both positive and negative symptoms of schizophrenia. Hence, it is thought that schizophrenic patients from developing countries fare better than their developed country counterparts due to the combination of clinical therapy and their own meditational customs.

== Criticisms ==
Limitations in supporting research and the presence of contradictory findings limit the validity of the outcomes paradox. For instance, the IPSS and DOSMeD studies experienced high attrition rates from the participants in developing countries due to issues including premature death. These high dropout rates biased the results, as it was generally the 'worst' patients who dropped out. Hence, the conclusion that those in developing countries have a better therapy outcome than those in developed countries lacks validity.

Additionally, the WHO conducted a follow-up study, the International Study of Schizophrenia (ISoS), 15 and 25 years after their two original studies. The ISoS returned to the IPSS and DOSMeD patients after this period of time to test whether the better outcomes observed in developing countries continued long-term. However, it was found that only half of the patients from developing countries that had the 'best outcomes' in the two previous studies, showed these same positive results longitudinally. Further research supported this longitudinal change, as in 2009, Kulhara reviewed 58 schizophrenia studies to compare long-term outcomes from developed and developing nations. His research found that after 15 years, there was still a larger proportion of patients with better outcomes in developing countries but to a lesser extent than when the study was first conducted. Hence, there is a temporal dimension to the outcomes paradox that is unaccounted for, which reduces its validity.
