= Taeuber Paradox =

Paradox in demography

The Taeuber Paradox is a paradox in demography, which results from two seemingly contradictory expectations given a population-wide decrease in mortality, e.g. from curing or reducing the mortality of a disease in a population. The two expectations are:

1. Since the disease would have otherwise caused some deaths, there should be fewer deaths if the disease is cured than in the world where the disease is not cured
2. Since everyone dies eventually, there must in the long run be the same number of deaths, and the deaths will be redistributed among the remaining causes.

The paradox was named after Conrad Taeuber (1906–99), a sociologist demographer.

== Resolution ==
The paradox is resolved by noting that the life expectancy of the population will increase when the disease is cured, leading to a temporary decrease in the overall death rate before deaths are reapportioned among other causes. Thus, curing a disease will not cause an overall decrease in population mortality, but can improve mortality in certain groups (e.g. at certain ages) within a population, or even across all groups (e.g. all ages) within the populations. Comparing two populations with the same overall mortality while one has lower mortality in each subgroup is an example of Simpson's paradox.

== Estimation ==
In the special case where the force of mortality is reduced by a constant fraction X, then the increase in life expectancy can be estimated as X * H * e, where e is the life expectancy before the reduction in mortality and H is estimated as (2 - e / a), where a is the stationary age of the population. As an example, if cancer is responsible for 10% of all deaths at all ages and were suddenly cured, in a population with an expected lifespan of 75 years and an average age of 50 (giving an estimated H of 1/2), we would estimate life expectancy to increase by only 3.75 years (5% of the original life expectancy, rather than the larger 10% increase you might expect intuitively).

As of 2005, H was estimated to be around 0.2 and 0.15 for men and women respectively in European and American countries with life expectancy of around 70, a significant decrease from estimates of 0.3 to 0.4 from 30 years earlier, which indicates that now more people live to near their life expectancy, and that a decrease in mortality would now result in a smaller increase in life expectancy.

Based on US government estimates using 1989 life table data, eliminating death from all malignant neoplasms would increase US life expectancy at birth by 3.36 years, while eliminating deaths from all major cardiovascular diseases would increase life expectancy at birth by 6.73 years.

== See also ==
- Sullivan's Index
