= Self-absorption paradox =

Association of self-awareness with distress and well-being

The self-absorption paradox describes the contradictory association whereby higher levels of self-awareness are simultaneously associated with higher levels of psychological distress and with psychological well-being.

In 1999 Trapnell and Campbell explored the self-absorption paradox in relation to private self-consciousness or attention to internal aspects of the self. They concluded that the relationship of self-awareness to psychological distress derived from a ruminative aspect of private self-consciousness, whereas the relationship of self-awareness to psychological well-being was attributed to self-contemplative reflection.

Reflective thinking has been regarded as a beneficial form of self-attention as it enables individuals to pursue greater self-understanding and reflect upon the internal processes and emotions that influence both themselves and others. A growing amount of literature has shown that self-consciousness is beneficial for self-regulation, identity development, and self-knowledge.

Private self consciousness has been attributed to more accurate self-knowledge, greater openness to experience, greater satisfaction in interpersonal relationships, less loneliness, more self-disclosure, and more reciprocal self-disclosure. It typically contributes to a healthier state of psychological mindedness and wellbeing.

Alternatively, ruminative thought processes and excessive self-focus can devolve into a negative cycle as it potentially amplifies perceived threats to the self by manifesting in the form of anxiety or fear. Such psychological distress often arises from a neurotic or ruminative aspect of self-attention. The tendency to self-focus has been associated with psychopathological states such as neuroticism, depression, obsessive thinking, and other negative mood states.

In 2006, Panayiotou & Kokkinos revealed data that showed a positive relationship of self-reflection with psychological distress using the Greek Self-Conscious Scale (GSC). Moreover, research showed self-reflection to be negatively correlated with happiness.

== Proposed explanations for the self-absorption paradox ==
=== Inflexibility of self-attention ===
Within a wide range of psychological disorders, there is a disproportionate level of persistent and inflexible self-absorption. According to Ingram (1990a), self-absorption was defined as a sustained and excessive self-focus across a variety of contexts. The clue to unravelling the self-absorption paradox lies in differentiating between self-absorption and chronic, non-pathological self-focused attention.

A non-self-absorbed form of self-attention involves a flexible process in which the individual's attention moves in response to different contexts or needs and is not detrimental to an individual's psychological health. Ingram proposed that self-attention can become inflexible to such a degree that a person's self-focus remains fixated on self-relevant information being absorbed from a variety of sources. If an individual cannot move out of a highly self-focused state, self-absorption is more likely to be associated with psychological distress.

The relationship between psychological health and a flexible type of internal self-focused attention partially explains the paradox. Chronic, self-focused attention by itself is not necessarily dysfunctional but becomes self-absorbing by "an inability to shift out of this state of self-focus in response to situational demands".

=== Self-regulation of Mood and Behaviour ===
Carver & Scheier's paper revealed that the self-regulation of mood and behaviour is closely linked to emotional states like anxiety and depression. It was as well linked to positive feelings but involved maintaining a positive self-concept and working towards personal goals. This process includes comparing one's current state to personal or societal standards and making adjustments to align with those standards.

Attempts to reach a desirable standard involve an evaluation by the individual of their current behaviour or situation against a desired standard. Secondly, the individual adjusts their behaviour to the desired standard. A negative affect then occurs if there is still a discrepancy between the current standard and a desired standard. On the other hand, positive affect occurs if the individual's behaviour achieves the desired standard.

Studies have examined the associations between adaptive self-regulation of unattainable goals and found that reengaging with valued alternative goals is an important part of the self-regulatory process for high subjective well-being.

According to Buss, how often and deeply people focus on themselves affects how they regulate behaviour. People vary not only in the length of time that they remain self-focused, but also in the content or direction of their self-focus. A person who is consistently self-conscious or temporarily self-aware about their public-self regulates behaviour more out of concern for the attitudes or expectations of others (public self-consciousness) than out of their own concerns. In contrast, a person who is consistently self-conscious or temporarily self-aware of bodily stimuli, internal states, or motives, regulates behaviour more in accord with inner values, feelings or physical sensations (private self- consciousness).

== Distinctions between self-rumination and self-reflection ==
The empirical grounds for depressive realism have loosened, and a depressed mood no longer appears to promise the cognitive clarity of "being sadder but wiser". It now appears that depressed mood can improve self-evaluative accuracy, and can impair it.

The distinction proposed to distinguish between rumination and reflection will prove useful to address dispositional aspects of this question, although the relation of these two traits to mental health is bound to be complex. Rumination may be a general risk factor for maladjustment, but reflection is likely to both help and hinder psychological adjustment. Although reflective self-focus may indeed foster articulation of the self-schema, accurate self-perception involves both costs and benefits. Removing the rose-colored coating from one's looking glass is unlikely to enhance self-confidence and optimism. The interpersonal benefits of accurate self-perception may, however, be substantial. Reflectiveness or psychological-mindedness appears to enhance observer perceptions of mental health and may buffer psychological distress within close relationships.

In a recent report, for example, the depression risk of women who were ruminative was significantly reduced if they had a reflective spouse . This intriguing "dyadic interaction" of reflection and rumination within close relationships suggests that the reflection-rumination distinction may be especially relevant to the coping and adjustment literature. Rumination and reflection appear to provide a useful 2X 2 model of cognitive approach and avoidance styles. In combination, they suggest an alternative definition of four cognitive styles with deep roots in the adjustment literature: sensitizing (high reflection, high rumination), repressive (low reflection, low rumination), vulnerable (low reflection, high rumination), and adaptable (high reflection, low rumination).

== Correspondence with the five-factor model ==
Wicklund argued that an individual-difference approach to self-awareness is seriously hampered by inherent "third variable" problems.

The Five-Factor Model (FFM), is a widely accepted framework in psychology for describing human personality. It categorizes personality into five dimensions: Openness to Experience, Conscientiousness, Extraversion, Agreeableness, and Neuroticism. These traits represent stable patterns of thought, emotion, and behavior and are commonly used in both research and applied settings to understand individual differences.

In the context of self-focused attention, researchers have found the FFM useful for clarifying the motivations underlying self-attentive behaviors. For example, self-focus linked to Openness may reflect curiosity and self-reflection, while self-focus tied to Conscientiousness may relate to self-regulation and responsibility. Other personality-based self-attentive dispositions, such as narcissism (linked to Extraversion and low Agreeableness) or self-monitoring (associated with social adaptability), can also be mapped onto the FFM framework. By situating self-focus within this established trait model, Trapnell and Campbell proposed a solution that aimed to reduce conceptual confusion and improve understanding of how and why people attend to the self in different ways.

== See also ==
- Hypochondria
