= Potato paradox =

Mathematical calculation with a counter-intuitive result

The potato paradox is a mathematical calculation that has a result which seems counterintuitive to many people. The Universal Book of Mathematics states the problem as such:

Fred brings home 100 kg of potatoes, which (being purely mathematical potatoes) consist of 99% water. He then leaves them outside overnight so that they consist of 98% water. What is their new weight? The surprising answer is 50 kg.

In Quine's classification of paradoxes, the potato paradox is a veridical paradox.

A visualization where blue boxes represent kg of water and the orange boxes represent kg of solid potato matter. Left, before dehydration: 1 kg matter, 99 kg water (99% water). Middle: 1 kg matter, 49 kg water (98% water).

If the potatoes are 99% water, the dry mass is 1%. This means that the 100 kg of potatoes contains 1 kg of dry mass, which does not change, as only the water evaporates.

In order to make the potatoes 98% water, the dry mass must become 2% of the total weight, double what it was before. The amount of dry mass, 1 kg, remains unchanged, so this can only be achieved by reducing the total mass of the potatoes. Since the proportion that is dry mass must be doubled, the total mass of the potatoes must be halved, answering 50 kg.

== Mathematical proof ==
Originally, 1% of the 100kg was dry matter, that is to say, 1kg. After they dried, the dry mass of the potatoes made up 2%, or one-fiftieth, of the total, which must therefore be 50 × 1kg = 50kg.

Let the total mass be x. Now, the dry mass of the potatoes before and after drying must remain the same. So, 2% of x = 1% of 100kg (i.e. initial mass of dry matter of the potatoes). Which after solving for x, one can simplify to x = 50kg.

== In popular culture ==
The potato paradox was a "Puzzler" on the Car Talk radio show.

The potato paradox is also mentioned in R. F. Kuang's 2025 novel Katabasis.
