= Washburn's paradox =

Washburn's paradox, Washburn's fallacy or the genetic similarity fallacy is a statement about the genetic relatedness of individuals that is relevant in Hamilton's rule. It is named for American anthropologist Sherwood Washburn, who discussed the issue in his critique of sociobiology and kin selection. The paradox was discussed by Dawkins who offered a resolution in favour of kin selection.

== The paradox ==
Washburn's objection to kin selection, as paraphrased by Dawkins was "All members of a species share more than 99% of their genes, so why shouldn't selection favour universal altruism?"

More formally, Hamilton's rule states that for an altruistic trait to be viable requires

$$rb > c$$

where

- $r$ is the genetic relatedness of recipient to the actor.
- $b$ is the benefit gained by the recipient.
- $c$ is the cost to the altruist.

A parent is often said to share 50% of their genes with their offspring, but according to Washburn "A parent does not share one half of the genes with its offspring; the offspring shares one half of the genes in which the parents differ." Modern genetics suggests any individual's genome will differ from a reference genome by only about 0.6%. Thus, according to Washburn, the $r$ values for parents, siblings or unrelated individuals are all close to 1.

Washburn further notes humans and chimpanzees share many of the same genes, much more than 50%, so Hamilton's rule suggests inter-species altruism. This has been summarised by the suggestion that we should be "nicer to mosquitos than to marigolds."

== Resolutions ==
=== Identity by Descent ===
A common but flawed solution is to note that the $r$ coefficient in Hamilton's rule refers to genes which are identical by descent. However as noted by Dawkins selection cannot distinguish identical genes from genes which are identical by descent.

More formally, following descent begins with the mutation that generated a particular gene. Selection and genetic drift change the gene frequency and mutation generates non-identical by descent copies. The infinite alleles model suggests that at equilibrium the number of nonidentical copies of alleles is

$$4N\mu + 1$$

for populations of size $N$ and mutation rate $\mu$. Values of $\mu$ around $10^{-6}$ are common so unless populations are very large most genes are identical by descent.

=== Stable Strategies ===
Dawkins gives the following argument. Let there be two strategies, U and K. U individuals are indiscriminate altruists and K individuals are kin altruists. In a population of U altruists, the U gene appears to be caring for copies of itself, as Washburn's argument suggests, since the beneficiaries of U's strategy also carry the U gene.

However this is not stable against invasion by K individuals. When a K individual behaves altruistically, it is likely to benefit another carrier of the K gene, while a U individual benefits both K and U individuals. Therefore K genes will spread at the expense of U genes.

=== Accepting the premise ===
According to Daly et al. many authors use Washburn's arguments not as a refutation of Hamilton's theory but as a validation of it. They cite Nancy Segal's claim of greater solidarity between identical compared to fraternal twins.
