= Excusable negligence =

Excusable negligence or excusable neglect is a legal concept used in some jurisdictions to allow certain types of neglect during a legal proceeding. Examples of such neglect may include misreading a filing date or failing to file due to circumstances beyond the party's control. When considering whether to excuse a neglected filing date, courts may look at several factors, how much it could affect the ongoing proceedings, whether the moving party was acting in good faith, and whether it could be prejudicial to the other party in the case.
