= Crocodile dilemma =

Logical paradox

The crocodile paradox, also known as crocodile sophism, is a paradox in logic in the same family of paradoxes as the liar paradox. The premise states that a crocodile, who has stolen a child, promises the parent that their child will be returned if and only if they correctly predict what the crocodile will do next.

The transaction is logically smooth but unpredictable if the parent guesses that the child will be returned, but a dilemma arises for the crocodile if the parent guesses that the child will not be returned. If the crocodile decides to keep the child, he violates his terms: the parent's prediction has been validated, and the child should be returned. However, if the crocodile decides to return the child, he still violates his terms, even if this decision is based on the previous result: the parent's prediction has been falsified, and the child should not be returned. The question of what the crocodile should do is therefore paradoxical, and there is no justifiable solution.

The crocodile dilemma exposes some of the logical problems posed by metaknowledge. In this regard, it is similar in construction to the unexpected hanging paradox, which Richard Montague (1960) used to demonstrate that the following assumptions about knowledge are inconsistent when tested in combination:

1. If ρ is known to be true, then ρ.
2. It is known that (i).
3. If ρ implies σ, and ρ is known to be true, then σ is also known to be true.

Ancient Greek sources were the first to discuss the crocodile dilemma.

== See also ==
- List of paradoxes
- Self-reference
- Halting problem – the usual proof of its undecidability uses a similar contradiction
