= The paradox of banknotes =

Increase of demand for physical currency amid declining usage

In economics, the paradox of banknotes or cash paradox is the observation that while the share of cash transactions has fallen over the past few decades due to alternative forms of payment such as credit cards and other electronic payment instruments, the demand for physical currency, measured as the ratio of currency in circulation (CIC) to GDP, has been steadily increasing since the early 2000s. This phenomenon contradicts the standard monetary model, wherein cash demand and use of cash in transactions are positively correlated.

First coined in 2009 by the then Chief Cashier of the Bank of England, Andrew Bailey, the paradox of banknotes originates with the increase in the CIC/GDP ratio in the early 2000s after a decades-long decline in cash demand beginning in the 1940s. While first identified and described in the circulation of the British Pound Sterling, the phenomenon is wide spread among a variety of currencies; between 2001 and 2019, the CIC/GDP ratio increased in 98 out of the 128 countries available within the International Financial Statistics Database of the International Monetary Fund (IMF).

The paradox of cash was further exacerbated and accelerated during the COVID-19 pandemic. An increase in demand for physical currency was present throughout 2020, despite a decrease of cash transactions and changing consumer payment habits associated with the pandemic. Out of the 128 countries within the IMF database, CIC increased by an average 18.7% in 2020, even with a 3.1% decrease in global GDP during the same period.

== Hypothesized causes ==
=== Money as a store of value ===
While the use of cash as a medium of exchange has been declining over the past few decades, the increase in demand for banknotes has been hypothesized to be associated with an increase demand for currency as a store of value.

==== Increased demand for cash in turbulent markets and times of crisis ====
Empirical studies suggest that during times of crisis, regardless of the category of crisis, demand for banknotes significantly increases. During times of financial crisis the attractiveness of physical currency as a relatively low-risk store of value increases. This increased demand is especially pronounced in large-denomination bills during a banking crisis where confidence in financial institutions decreases; such was the case during the Great Recession where the value notes in circulation of the USD increased by 10.6%, the Euro by 18.8%, while GDP declined by 4.3% and 4.0% respectively.

The effect on CIC/GDP ratio is particularly strong in times of financial recession, especially if the permanent income hypothesis holds and households maintain excess cash reserves according to their permanent income rather than falling current income; as GDP decreases through the recession and cash demand through household reserves increase simultaneously, the CIC/GDP ratio will increase despite lower economic activity.

Further studies have shown that market turbulence and unpredictability increase the attractiveness of cash as a store of wealth. Similarly to decreasing confidence in financial institution during times of financial crisis, market unpredictability lowers yields of alternative investments such as equity or bonds, and further increases risk of those investments. Market turbulence thus makes low-risk low-return assets, such as cash, relatively more attractive, especially to risk-averse agents. Therefore as market unpredictability, often brought on by times of crisis, increases, the demand for cash increases. The prevalence of consistent market turbulence over the past two decades, brought on by events such as the Dot Com Bubble, Great Recession, and COVID-19 pandemic, have thus increased demand for cash in spite of GDP movement.

The demand and holding of smaller denomination bills for transactional purposes have also been shown to increase during times of crisis and especially during natural disasters as the confidence in and availability of electronic payment instruments decrease.

==== Increased use of cash as a store of value in low interest markets ====
The demand for cash as a store of value has been shown to be inversely correlated with low interest rates; as the earnings of alternative higher-risk investments decline, the appeal of holding low-risk low-return assets, such as cash, increases. John Maynard Keynes describes this concept as the speculative demand for money. Within the same period that the demand for money as ratio of CIC/GDP has increased, global average interest rates have declined since their highs in the 1980s, to historic lows in the mid-2010s. While the decline in interest rates, especially after the Great Recession, has contributed to increased cash demands, it is not wholly responsible for the rise in money demand.

==== Foreign demand for bank notes as reserve currency ====
There is significant overlap between currencies for which the paradox of banknotes is most pronounced and those used most as reserve currency by foreign governments. In particular, beginning in the early 2000s China's foreign reserves have exponentially grown to nearly twenty times their pre-2000s level; this trend can be seen in many other countries which have run a trade surplus over the past two decades. The share of USD held as foreign reserves and within foreign individuals have increased from 36.4% to 44.7% in the same time period, with similar trends occurring for the Euro with an estimated 30–50% of Euro notes being held by foreign entities. These increases in share of currency held by foreign entities can partial offset its decrease use as a medium of exchange.
