= Glucose paradox =

Observation in medicine

The glucose paradox was the observation that the large amount of glycogen in the liver was not explained by the small amount of glucose absorbed. The explanation was that the majority of glycogen is made from a number of substances other than glucose. The glucose paradox was first formulated by biochemists J. Denis McGarry and Joseph Katz in 1984.

== Significance ==
The glucose paradox demonstrates the importance of the chemical compound lactate in the biochemical process of carbohydrate metabolism. The paradox is that the large amount of glycogen (10%) found in the liver cannot be explained by the liver's small absorption of glucose.

After the body's digestion of carbohydrates and them entering the circulatory system in the form of glucose, some will be absorbed directly into the muscle tissue and will be converted into lactic acid throughout the anaerobic energy system, rather than going directly to the liver and being converted into glycogen. The lactate is then taken and converted by the liver, forming the material for liver glycogen. The majority of the body's liver glycogen is produced indirectly, rather than directly from glucose in the blood.

Under normal physiological conditions, glucose is a poor precursor compound and use by the liver is limited.
