= No–no paradox =

Semantic paradox

The no–no paradox is a distinctive paradox belonging to the family of the semantic paradoxes (like the Liar paradox). It derives its name from the fact that it consists of two sentences each simply denying what the other says.

== History ==
A variation on the paradox occurs already in Thomas Bradwardine’s Insolubilia. The paradox itself appears as the eighth sophism of chapter 8 of John Buridan’s Sophismata. Although the paradox went largely unnoticed even during 20th-century revival of semantic paradoxes, it has recently been rediscovered (and dubbed with its current name) by the American philosopher Roy Sorensen, and is now appreciated for the distinctive difficulties it presents.

== Formulation ==
The notion of truth seems to be governed by the naive schema:

(T): The sentence ' P ' is true if and only if P

(where we use single quotes to refer to the linguistic expression inside the quotes). Consider however the two sentences:

(N_{1}): (N_{2}) is not true

(N_{2}): (N_{1}) is not true

Reasoning in classical logic, there are four possibilities concerning (N_{1}) and (N_{2}):

1. Both (N_{1}) and (N_{2}) are true
2. Both (N_{1}) and (N_{2}) are not true
3. (N_{1}) is true and (N_{2}) is not true
4. (N_{1}) is not true and (N_{2}) is true

Yet, possibilities 1. and 2. are ruled out by the instances of (T) for (N_{1}) and (N_{2}). To wit, possibility 1. is ruled out because, if (N_{1}) is true, then, by (T), (N_{2}) is not true; possibility 2. is ruled out because, if (N_{1}) is not true, then, by (T), (N_{2}) is true. It would then seem that either of possibilities 3. and 4. should obtain. Yet, both of those possibilities would also seem repugnant, as, on each of them, two perfectly symmetrical sentences would mysteriously diverge in truth value.

== Discussion ==
Generally speaking, the paradox instantiates the problem of determining the status of ungrounded sentences that are not inconsistent. More in particular, the paradox presents the challenge of expanding one’s favourite theory of truth with further principles which either express the symmetry intuition against possibilities 3. and 4. or make them acceptable in spite of their intuitive repugnancy. Because (N_{1}) and (N_{2}) do not lead to inconsistency, a certain strand in the discussion of the paradox has been willing to assume both the relevant instances of (T) and classical logic, thereby deriving the conclusion that either possibility 3. or possibility 4. holds. Such conclusion has in turn been taken to have momentous consequences for certain influential philosophical theses. Consider, for example, the thesis of truthmaker maximalism:

(TM): If a sentence is true, there is something that makes it true

If, as per possibilities 3. and 4., one of (N_{1}) or (N_{2}) is true and the other one is not true, then, given the symmetry between the two sentences, it might seem that there is nothing that makes true whichever of the two is in fact true. If so, (TM) would fail. These and similar conclusions have however been contested by other philosophers on the grounds that, as evidenced by Curry's paradox, joint reliance on (T) and classical logic might be problematic even when it does not lead to inconsistency.
