= The paradox of variation =

Paradox relating to genetic diversity

The Paradox of Variation or Lewontin's Paradox refers to the mismatch between the observed range of genetic diversity and the predictions of neutral theory.

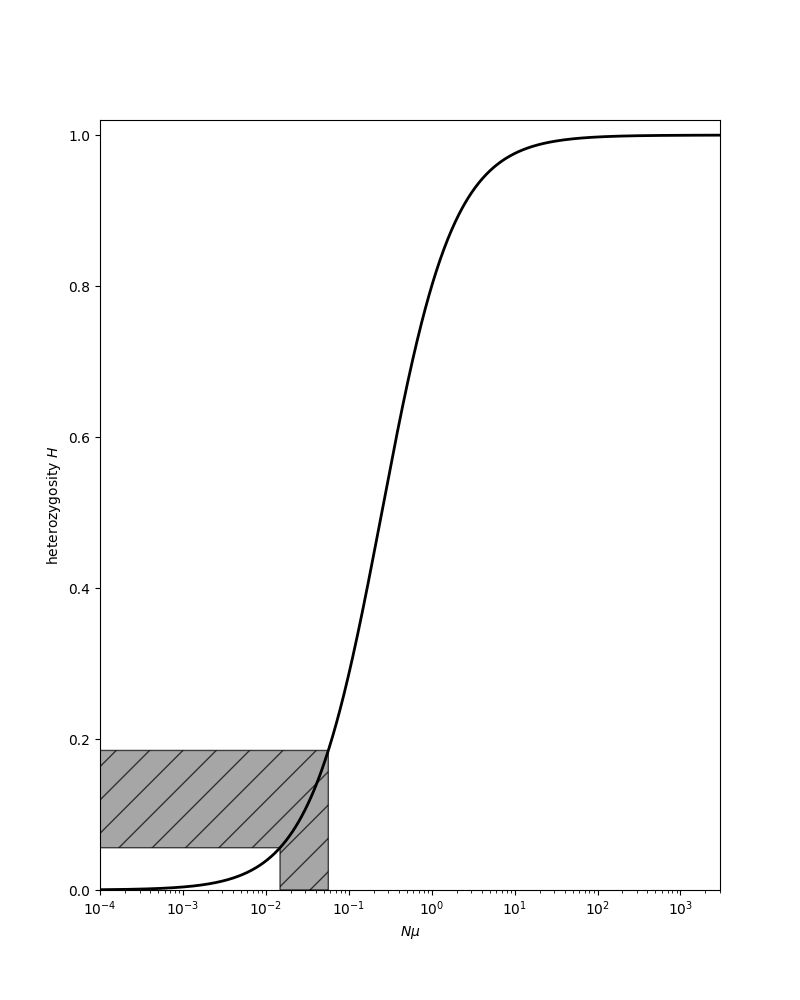
Heterozygosity predicted by the neutral mutation hypothesis as a function of population size $N$ and mutation rate $\mu$. The observed range of heterozygosity (y-axis) is only compatible with a narrow range of diversity values $N\mu$ (x-axis)

The paradox was first observed by geneticist Richard Lewontin who noted that neutral theory predicts the heterozygosity, or genetic diversity, of a population of $N$ individuals with mutation rate $\mu$ per locus is

$$H = 1 - \frac{1}{4N\mu + 1}$$

Observed values of $H$ range from $\sim 6%$ to $\sim 20%$. With a mutation rate of $\mu = 10^{-6}$ this implies a variation in $N$ between around 3,750 to 15,000, a much smaller range of populations than observed. Lewontin states

Since there is no reason to suppose that mutation rate has been specially adjusted in evolution to be the reciprocal of population size for higher organisms, we are required to believe that higher organisms including man, mouse, Drosphila and the horseshoe crab all have population sizes within a factor 4 of each other

Later work shows that while diversity varies over about 3 orders of magnitude, population size varies over 12 orders of magnitude.

== Resolution ==
Early discussions of the paradox by Maynard Smith suggested an explanation involving genetic hitchhiking, as favourable mutations spread they 'drag along' nearby sections of DNA, fixing them and reducing diversity. Neutral theorists like Kimura pointed out that the appropriate value of $N$ in the diversity formula is not the census population but the effective population, which can be much smaller due to population bottlenecks and other effects.

More recent work suggests that even a combination of genetic hitchhiking and background selection is not sufficient to explain the lack of diversity. Charlesworth and Jensen suggest many species might be quite far from reaching their equilibrium diversity because they have recently experienced a selective sweep and are still expanding from a population bottleneck. Other work suggests genetic diversity might be underestimated by sequence alignment methods.
