= Charlesworth's paradox =

Paradox relating to kin selection

Charlesworth's Paradox is a paradox related to kin selection, Hamilton's Rule and the evolution of altruism. The paradox was proposed by Brian Charlesworth and is sometimes used as a teaching example to discuss kin selection.

== The paradox ==
Hamilton's rule states that altruistic genes or strategies (in a prisoner's dilemma for example) should increase in frequency if

$$rb > c$$

Where

- $r$ is the genetic relatedness of individuals concerned.
- $b$ is the benefit gained by the recipient of altruism.
- $c$ is the cost to the individual performing the act.

Charlesworth imagines a species of bird in which young can stay behind to help their parents care for the next season's young, rather than founding their own nests.

A situation arises where an individual can sacrifice its own reproductive success to save the lives of its four younger siblings. This will result in $b = 4$ and $c = 1$ (the 4 young survive and the older sibling dies). For siblings $r = 0.5$. Since $rb = 2 > c = 1$ this behaviour should evolve by Hamilton's rule. However it cannot be viable, because any individual exhibiting this behaviour sacrifices itself and does not reproduce.

== Resolution ==
McElreath and Boyd suggest that Hamilton's rule only applies in cases of weak selection, which is an underlying assumption in deriving it. Other authors resolve the paradox for strong selection through a modified version of inclusive fitness.
