= Buridan's bridge =

Logical paradox

Buridan's Bridge (also known as Sophism 17) is described by Jean Buridan, one of the most famous and influential philosophers of the Late Middle Ages, in his book Sophismata. It is a self-referential paradox that involves a proposition pronounced about an event that might or might not happen in the future.

== The sophism ==
The sophism is:

Socrates wants to cross a river and comes to a bridge guarded by Plato. The two speak as follows:

Plato: "Socrates, if in the first proposition which you utter, you speak the truth, I will permit you to cross. But surely, if you speak falsely, I shall throw you into the water."

Socrates: "You will throw me into the water."

Socrates' response puts Plato in a difficult situation. He could not throw Socrates into the water, because if he did he would violate his promise to let Socrates cross the bridge if he speaks the truth. On the other hand, if Plato allows Socrates to cross the bridge it would mean that Socrates spoke untruth when he replied: "You are going to throw me into the water." In that case Socrates should have been thrown into the water. In other words, Socrates could be allowed to cross the bridge if and only if he could not be.

== Buridan's solution ==
In order to solve the paradox Buridan proposes three questions:

1. Is the proposition uttered by Socrates: "You are going to throw me into the water" true, or is it false?
2. Is Plato's promise true or is it false?
3. "What ought Plato to do to fulfill his promise?"

In response to the first question Buridan states that it is impossible to determine if Socrates' proposition is true or false. This is because the proposition "You are going to throw me into the water" is a future contingent that could be true or false depending on what Plato is going to do. Dr. Joseph W. Ulatowski says that Buridan apparently used Aristotle's thesis about what "truth" is to come up with this response. Aristotle believed that a proposition is true if and only if it is verified by the state of things as they currently are. Contradicting the principle of bivalence, Buridan implies a system of three-valued logic in which there are three truth values—true, false, and some indeterminate third value.

In determining the truth value of Plato's conditional promise, Buridan suggests that Plato's promise was false, and that because Plato gave his promise carelessly he is not obligated to fulfill the promise.

In discussing the third question, "What ought Plato to do to fulfill his promise", Buridan states that Plato should not have given a conditional promise in the first place. He also suggests that Plato could have made sure that the condition was formulated in such a way that it would not cause a contradiction; because Plato cannot fulfill his conditional promise without violating it, he is not obligated to fulfill the promise. Ulatowski points out that this interpretation is the contrapositive of a principle of Immanuel Kant: "ought implies can".

== Philosophers on the sophism and its solution ==
In his solution to the sophism, Walter Burley (d. 1344/1345) applied the principle "nothing is true unless at this instant" ("nihil est verum nisi in hoc instanti") and concluded that "if a proposition is true it must be true now".

Dr. Dale Jacquette of the University of Bern says that "Plato can either permit Socrates to pass or have him seized and thrown into the river without violating his conditional vow". Jacquette argues that Plato's conditional promise was given only in regard to Socrates's proposition being clearly and unconditionally either true or false. To prove his point Jacquette asks, what would Plato have to do if Socrates had said nothing and was "as silent as a Sphinx", or if he uttered something that could not be either proven or "undisproven", something like Goldbach's conjecture. Jacquette concludes that Plato's conditional promise was true, and Socrates's proposition is "neither true simpliciter nor false simpliciter", and therefore Plato would be right regardless of the choice that he made.

In his book Paradoxes from A to Z Professor Michael Clark comes to the conclusion that if Plato is an honorable man, Socrates should not get wet under any circumstances. Clark argues that Socrates could say, "Either I am speaking falsely, and you will throw me in, or I am speaking truly, and you won't throw me in". Clark says that if this sentence is true, then it means that the first alternative "is ruled out", leaving us only with the second one. If this sentence is false, it means that both alternatives are false, and because Socrates spoke falsely "it will be false" to throw him into the river.

Dr. Joseph W. Ulatowski believes that since the truth value in Plato's conditional promise and even more so in Socrates's proposition is indeterminate, it means that Plato "ought to err on the side of caution with respect to the future contingency and allow Socrates to cross the bridge". In the same work Ulatowski offers a couple of humorous solutions to the paradox. Plato, Ulatowski says, could let Socrates to cross the bridge, and then throw him into water on the other side. Or both Plato and Socrates could combine their efforts and forcibly eject Buridan himself from Buridan's bridge.

== In Don Quixote ==
Buridan's bridge sophism was used by Miguel de Cervantes in Don Quixote, when Sancho was presented with the Buridan's bridge dilemma: A man who was going to cross the bridge was asked to respond truthfully where he was going or otherwise to face a death by hanging. The man "swore and said that by the oath he took he was going to die upon that gallows that stood there, and nothing else."

Sancho summarizes the situation by saying: "the man swears that he is going to die upon the gallows; but if he dies upon it, he has sworn the truth, and by the law enacted deserves to go free and pass over the bridge; but if they don't hang him, then he has sworn falsely, and by the same law deserves to be hanged". He then comes up with the solution, "that of this man they should let pass the part that has sworn truly, and hang the part that has lied; and in this way the conditions of the passage will be fully complied with". After Sancho makes this statement, the person who was asking for advice reasons with him:

"But then, señor governor," replied the querist, "the man will have to be divided into two parts; and if he is divided of course he will die; and so none of the requirements of the law will be carried out, and it is absolutely necessary to comply with it."

Sancho comes up with the moral solution:

...there is the same reason for this passenger dying as for his living and passing over the bridge; for if the truth saves him the falsehood equally condemns him; and that being the case it is my opinion you should say to the gentlemen who sent you to me that as the arguments for condemning him and for absolving him are exactly balanced, they should let him pass freely, as it is always more praiseworthy to do good than to do evil.
