= Egonomics =

Egonomics is the idea that "within each individual exists two selves: the past or future self and the present self, constantly at odds, leading to a sort of cognitive dissonance between the two. Both selves exist within us and are equally valid, but aren’t always active at the same time. It’s a natural and ongoing conflict between immediate desire and long-term desires, we call longing." Egonomics is the pursuit of awareness of that longing. (Gaurav, 2022)

== Overview ==
‘Egonomics’, coined by Thomas Schelling in his paper “Egonomics, or the Art of Self-Management”, is a theory which builds upon the observation that individuals place too much emphasis on attaining short-term gratification at the expense of realising future benefits. The novel insight of Schelling's paper comes from his theoretical framing of this fact, proposing that there is a conflict between different ‘selves’ within the mind of the decision maker. From this, Schelling proposed a set of self-management solutions to overcome this problem. This understanding of egonomics has been important in the development of economics and psychology and behavioural economics.

== Egonomics' theoretical basis ==
The key theory which supports Schelling's work is that of time inconsistency. Schelling summarises what time inconsistency problem is in the following quote:

"What I have in mind is an act or decision that a person takes [based upon] preferences [that] differ from what they were earlier...If the person could make the final decision about that action at the earlier time, precluding a later change in mind, he would make a different choice..." (Schelling 1978)

This framework is used by Schelling to explain the reasons for the prevalence of phenomena like smoking or the high failure rate of diets.

According to egonomics, although most people acknowledge dieting leads to individual benefits (such as improved health), this benefit is realised far in the future from the decision to start dieting. In addition, dieting imposes immediate costs on the individual (such as the opportunity cost of not eating sugary foods). Since individuals often prioritise short term concerns over long term ones, they will ignore self-acknowledged long-term benefits of dieting because of short term temptations. In turn, this leads them to break their diets, even though their optimal decision is to continue with it. The ‘self’ which makes this irrational decision is what Schelling refers to as the wayward self. Only after the diet is broken do individuals recognise the mistake of this ‘other self’ and regret their decision. Schelling characterises this as the straight self.

=== Modern understanding of egonomics ===
Shelling's theoretical framework for understanding egonomics has been updated by Chatterjee and Krishna (2009). They draw inspiration from Schelling's ‘dual self’ categorisation but use this to demonstrate how an individual could rationally prioritise current benefits at the expense of those in the future, even if future benefits were greater in absolute terms. This departs from Schelling's idea that short-term thinking is totally irrational behaviour.

The authors redefine these two selves as being in a ‘hot state’ and a ‘cold state’, referring to Schelling's wayward and straight definitions respectively. They propose that the extent to which individuals prioritise current consumptions depends on both the future benefit's size and how far in the future they're realised. They model this through the incorporation of a discount factor (δ). This represents the loss in utility of the future benefit to the individual because of the time they must wait to attain it. Accordingly, even if in the future the benefit from dieting may be larger than that of breaking it, if the future benefit is distant enough or too small, individuals could rationally choose the smaller but immediate option. When this future arrives, Chatterjee and Krishna's updated theory still concurs with Shelling's conclusion that the individual wishes they had been patient.

There has also been significant literature seeking to define a quantitative value for this discount factor (Giwa et al., 2021), but most studies have found its size depends on the context in question and the cultural background of the individual (Ishii et al., 2017). This paper finds this is especially true when comparing W.E.I.R.D. (western, educated, industrialised, rich and democratic) societies (American) to non-W.E.I.R.D. societies (Japan). This is an active area of research in both economics and psychology.

== Incorporation into modern literature ==
=== Psychology ===
Salas-Morellon et al. (2021) demonstrate the prevalence of time inconsistencies among our closest evolutionary relatives (chimpanzees, orangutans and gorillas), suggesting that time inconsistency ‘is part of our evolutionary heritage’. Hayden (2018) outlines an ultimate reason for the evolutionary selection of time inconsistent preferences observed by Schelling, while also explaining why this adaption is no longer optimal in modern society. He argues time inconsistency, or impatience, was evolutionarily selected for because in a world of insecurity (or ‘bounded optimality’), there was often little evolutionary benefits of patience because individuals would often not survive long enough to realise them. Due to greater security in the modern world, now individuals are more likely to realise the benefits of greater patience. This means that evolved impatience is not as beneficial as it once was.

=== Economics ===
Harstad (2020) identifies time inconsistency, the theory central to egonomics, as a key factor in explaining the underinvestment in greener technologies by politicians today. He argues that rational individuals would invest more in green technologies than the current amount due to the costs of not doing so, but an underappreciation of the future costs and the significant political costs of doing so ensure that politicians continue to underinvest.

== Egonomics' solutions ==
Egonomics not only seeks to understand time inconsistencies, but also propose solutions to overcome issues relating to time inconsistencies. Schelling suggested a number of strategies for dealing with this issue. These included precommitment, use of bright line rules, delay tactics, or creating a pre-arranged deal between selves.

There has been significant academic debate since Schelling's initial recommendations. Most notably, Duckworth et al. (2014) noted the distinction between proactive and reactive strategies. Proactive strategies are instances where control strategies are implemented in anticipation of a situation whereas reactive ones are only implemented once there is an immediate need for them. The authors favour proactive strategies because they can encourage a ‘self-control cycle’, whereby early exercises of self-control lead to more in the future. Indeed, Duckworth (2016) show proactive self-control strategies lead to better grades amongst students than reactive strategies.

=== Example of proactive self-control strategy ===
Precommitment is the most common tool advanced within egonomics. Elster's Theory (1985) states that precommitment can help humans ‘achieve rationality by indirect means’ as it limits the potential for temptation, as demonstrated in ‘The Ulysses Problem’. This prevents them from succumbing to short term temptations and attaining the desired outcome. This is also shown in recent work by Dresser (2021).

==== Problems ====
Dresser (2021) cite ethical problems related to precommitment devices, specifically within medical contexts such as the Opioid Crisis. Relating to preventative medicine, she notes issues around informed consent and the ability of individuals to compel their doctor to cease the precommitment agreement. However, Dineen (2021) explains how the same commitment device helps doctors when patients refuse lifesaving treatment. This topic is still hotly debated within the literature.

== See also ==
- Commitment device
- Picoeconomics
