= Giorgio Coricelli =

Italian economist

Giorgio Coricelli is professor of economics and psychology at the University of Southern California, specializing in neuroeconomics. Having done his undergraduate studies at La Sapienza in Rome, he then completed his Ph.D. at the Economic Science Laboratory of the University of Arizona studying with Vernon Smith, shortly before Smith received his Nobel Prize in economics in 2002.

His research focuses on neuroeconomics, experimental economics and game theory. Besides Vernon Smith, he collaborated with Kevin McCabe, Aldo Rustichini and Sarah-Jayne Blakemore. He founded the Neuroeconomics Lab at USC, while being a member of the CNRS and of the CIMEC lab in Trento, Italy.

== Research ==
Coricelli was trained by the founding father of experimental economics, Vernon Smith, and later joined in 2004 the Institut des Sciences Cognitives in Lyon, France, to perform experimental research using neuroimaging. His work combines economics with scientific psychology, and aims at "understanding human behaviors emerging from the interplay of cognitive and emotional systems" in the human mind, more specifically "the role of emotions in decision-making and the relational complexity in social interaction".

His most cited work investigated counterfactual thinking and its locus of activity in the brain, in particular for the emotion of regret. Using game theory and in collaboration with Rosemarie Nagel, he also investigated strategic thinking and identified the brain loci of different levels of strategic reasoning (in beauty contest games). His most recent work has focused on bounded rationality, social uncertainty, social learning, and impaired decision-making. Among his influences are William James and Piero Sraffa. He coined the term "neuroeconomics" while working at Vernon Smith's lab in Arizona.
