= QRE =

QRE can be an abbreviation for:

- Quantal response equilibrium (game-theoretic term)
- Quantified Regular Expression
- Quantum Resource Estimation
- Quick Reaction Element (military term)
- Query and Reporting Environment
- Quick Response Engine
- Queens Road Elite
- Quasi-Reference Electrode
- Qualified Revolving Exposure (banking term)
- Qualified Restoration (or Rehabilitation) Expenses (tax term)
- Questionnaire (market research term)
