= Eardex.com =

- Website type: Wiki for local product prices to provide cost of living and travel budget information
- Available in: English, German
- Owner: Eardex.com GbR
- Website: www.eardex.com
- Registration: Optional
- Launched: 10/2011

Eardex.com (short for Earth Index) was a free website to find, share and compare information on cost of living worldwide. It worked like a wiki for prices in all the towns and cities, regions and countries of the world. The Eardex database collected and displayed the local prices of more than 45 popular products which are available all over the world.

The website was based on the wisdom of the crowd principle: the data (i.e. local product prices) was provided by the users (User-generated content).

The website was free to use. A registration (also free) was possible but not mandatory. The site offered a lot of information for non-registered users, however, signing up was necessary to use all features. By signing up (email address required) a number of additional features became available, such as setting your preferred units of measurement and quantities for the listed products, the currency and the language for future visits.

Eardex.com was available in two languages, English and German. It was operated by Eardex.com GbR which was founded in October 2011 (also the launch date of the website) by Fabian Walker and Steffen Schmeißer in Cologne, Germany. The website was privately financed and was developed and set up within one year, by up to four people working on it.

== Media recommendations ==
Eardex was called the "Best New Travel Budget Planning Tool" on AirTreks and "one of the most helpful websites on the Internet" by MakeUseOf.

Eardex.com has also been recommended by several other blogs and newspapers from different countries and in different languages, including French, Spanish, Portuguese, Japanese, Bulgarian, and others.

In Germany, there was an interview with Eardex founder Fabian Walker in Die Zeit (print and online version), a German nationwide weekly newspaper.

Eardex.com has also been featured nationwide on German television (WDR) and radio programs (SWR and Funkhaus Europa).
