= Focal point (game theory) =

Concept in game theory

In game theory, a focal point (or Schelling point) is a solution that people tend to choose by default in the absence of communication in order to avoid coordination failure. The concept was introduced by the American economist Thomas Schelling in his book The Strategy of Conflict (1960). Schelling states that "[p]eople can often concert their intentions or expectations with others if each knows that the other is trying to do the same" in a cooperative situation (p. 57), so their action would converge on a focal point which has some kind of prominence compared with the environment. However, the conspicuousness of the focal point depends on time, place and people themselves. It may not be a definite solution.

== Existence ==
The existence of the focal point is first demonstrated by Schelling with a series of questions. Here is one example: to determine the time and place to meet a stranger in New York City, but without being able to communicate in person beforehand. In this coordination game, any place and time in the city could be an equilibrium solution. Schelling asked a group of students this question and found that the most common answer was "noon at (the information booth at) Grand Central Terminal". There is nothing that makes Grand Central Terminal a location with a higher payoff because people could just as easily meet at another public location, such as a bar or a library, but its tradition as a meeting place raises its salience and therefore makes it a natural "focal point". Later, Schelling's informal experiments have been replicated under controlled conditions with monetary incentives by Judith Mehta.

The existence of focal points can help explain the use of social norms, including traditional gender roles, in order to ensure coordination, and why changing said norms can be difficult.

== Theories ==
Although the concept of a focal point has been widely accepted in game theory, it is still unclear how a focal point forms. The researchers have proposed theories from two aspects.

=== The level-n theory ===
Stahl and Wilson argue that a focal point is formed because players would try to predict how other players act. They model the level of "rational expectation" players have by their ability to

1. form priors (models) about the behavior of other players;
2. choose the best responses given these priors.

A level-0 player will choose actions regardless of the actions of other players. A level-1 player believes that all other players are level-0 types. A level-n player estimates that all other players are level-0, 1, 2, ..., n − 1 types. Based on experimental data, most of the players only use one model to predict the behavior of all the other players. Although the hierarchy of types could be indefinite, the benefits of higher levels would decrease substantially while incurring a much greater cost. Because of the limit of players' expectation level and players' priors, it is possible to reach an equilibrium in games without communication.

==== The cognitive hierarchy theory ====
The cognitive hierarchy (CH) theory is a derivation of level-n theory. A level-n player from the CH model would assume that their strategy is the most sophisticated and that the levels 0, 1, 2, ..., n − 1 on which their opponents play follow a normalized Poisson distribution. This model works well in multi-player games where the players need to estimate a number in a given range, such as the Guess 2/3 of the average game. A player would be able to determine the value which they should play based on the assumed distribution of lower-level players described by the Poisson distribution. Another example of a game involving CH theory is the Keynesian beauty contest.

=== The team reasoning ===
Bacharach argued that people could find a focal point because they act as members of a team instead of individuals in a cooperative game. With the identity changed, the player follows the prescription of an imaginary group leader to maximize the group interest.

== Examples ==
=== Schelling's questions ===
Here is a subset of the questions raised by Schelling to prove the existence of a focal point.

1. Head-tail game: Name "heads" or "tails". If the two players name the same, they win an award, otherwise, they get nothing.
2. Letter order game: Give an order to letters A, B, and C. If the three players give the same order, they win an award, otherwise they get nothing.
3. Split money game: Two players share $100. They first write down their individual claims on a sheet of paper. If their claims add to $100 or less, both of them will get exactly what they claimed, but if the sum is higher than $100, they get nothing.

The results of the informal experiments are

1. For the two players, A and B, in head-tail game. 16 out of 22 A and 15 out of 22 B chose "heads".
2. For the three players, A, B, and C, in letter order game. 9 out of 12 A, 10 out of 12 B, and 14 out of 16 C wrote "ABC".
3. For the players to claim part of the $100. 36 out of 40 chose $50. 2 of the remainder chose $49 and $49.99.

These games suggest that focal points have some saliency. These characteristics make them preferable choices to people. Furthermore, people would assume each other has also noticed the saliency and make the same decision.

=== In coordination game ===
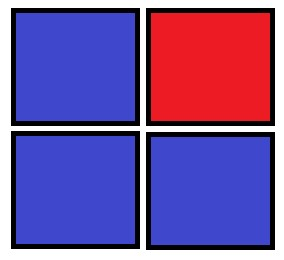
Coordination game example

In a simple example, two people unable to communicate with each other are each shown a panel of four squares and asked to select one; if and only if they both select the same one, they will each receive a prize. Three of the squares are blue and one is red. Assuming they each know nothing about the other player, but that they each do want to win the prize, then they will, reasonably, both choose the red square.

The red square is not in a sense a better square; they could win by both choosing any square and in this sense, all squares are technically a Nash equilibrium. The red square is the "right" square to select only if a player can be sure that the other player has selected it, but by hypothesis neither can. However, it is the most salient and notable square, so—lacking any other one—most people will choose it, and this will in fact (often) work.

=== Collision game ===
Collision game example
| Player 2 Player 1 | Straight | Left | Right |
|---|---|---|---|
| Straight | Crash | Win | Win |
| Left | Win | Win | Crash |
| Right | Win | Crash | Win |

Focal points can also have real-life applications. For example, imagine two bicycles headed towards each other and in danger of crashing. Avoiding collision becomes a coordination game where each player's winning choice depends on the other player's choice. Each player, in this case, has the choice to go straight, swerve to the left or swerve to the right. Both players want to avoid crashing, but neither knows what the other will do. In this case, the decision to swerve right can serve as a focal point which leads to the winning right–right outcome. It seems a natural focal point in places using right-hand traffic.

This idea of anti-coordination game is also apparent in the game of chicken, which involves two cars racing toward each other on a collision course and in which the driver who first decides to swerve is seen as a coward, while no driver swerving results in a fatal collision for both.

=== “Guess 2/3 of the average” game ===
The Guess 2/3 of the average game shows the level-n theory in practice. In this game, players are tasked with guessing an integer from 0 to 100 inclusive which they believe is closest to 2/3 of the average of all players’ guesses. A Nash equilibrium can be found by thinking through each level:

- Level 0: The average can be in [0, 100].
- Level 1: The average can be in [0, 67], which is 2/3 of the maximum average of level 0.
- Level 2: The average can be in [0, 45], which is 2/3 of the maximum average of level 1.
- Level N: Assuming all other players reason similarly, 2/3 of the maximum average will never be higher than $100 \cdot (2/3)^N.$

As N grows, 2/3 of the average will trend towards zero. At this point, the only Nash equilibrium is for all players to guess 0.

Adding repetition to the game introduces a focal point at the Nash equilibrium solution of 0. This was shown by Camerer as, “[when] the game is played multiple times with the same group, the average moves close to 0”. Introducing the iterative aspect to the game forces all players onto higher levels of thinking, which allows them all to play guesses trending towards 0.

== See also ==
- Game theory
- Coordination failure (economics)
- Coordination game
- Simultaneous game
- Surprisingly popular
- Equilibrium selection
- Rendezvous problem, the mathematical problem of maximising the probability of two people meeting
