= Strategic realism =

Strategic realism is a theory of international relations associated with Thomas Schelling.
