= Vicarious problem-solving =

Vicarious problem-solving is a rational actor approach developed by Thomas Schelling. In economic reasoning it is an educated common sense where one informally models the situation assuming agents ‘operate in a purposeful manner, aware of their values and alert to their opportunities’. Using this approach, the researcher figures out what an agent might do by imagining him or herself in the person's position, as best he or she understands that position, and decides what that person will likely do, given that person's aims, values, objectives and constraints.

Vicarious problem solving has been criticised as a type of armchair theorising.
