= Cognitive hierarchy theory =

Cognitive hierarchy theory (CHT) is a behavioral model originating in behavioral economics and game theory that attempts to describe human thought processes in strategic games. CHT aims to improve upon the accuracy of predictions made by standard analytic methods (including backwards induction and iterated elimination of dominated strategies), which can deviate considerably from actual experimental outcomes.

== The Level-k Framework ==
Level-k theory is a competing theory to Cognitive Hierarchy Theory but is similar to Cognitive Hierarchy Theory in the sense that player types are drawn from a hierarchy of levels of iterated rationalizability.

The hierarchy begins with some very naive type. This completely non-strategic "level-zero" player will choose actions without regard to the actions of other players. Such a player is said to have zero-order beliefs.

A one level higher sophisticated type believe the population consists of all naive types. This slightly more sophisticated (the level one) player believes that the other players will act non-strategically; his or her action will be the best response consistent with those first-order beliefs.

The next level believes the population consists of the first level. This more sophisticated (level two) player acts on the belief that the other players are level one. This pattern continues for higher-level players, but each player has only a finite depth of reasoning, meaning that individual players have a limit to the depth to which they can reason strategically.

Econometrically, a Mixture Model is typically used to identify subpopulations. Within each subpopulation, deviation from the prescribed action for the type can be captured either as computation errors or as within-type heterogeneity in beliefs.

Level-k theory assumes that players in strategic games base their decisions on their predictions about the likely actions of other players. According to level-k, players in strategic games can be categorized by the "depth" of their strategic thought. It is thus heavily focused on bounded rationality.

In its basic form, level-k theory implies that each player believes that they are the most sophisticated person in the game. Players at some level k will neglect the fact that other players could also be level-k, or even higher. This has been attributed to many factors, such as "maintenance costs" or simply overconfidence.

== The Cognitive Hierarchy Framework ==
Some theorists have noted that players do not necessarily fall under the archetypes above. Instead, a player can act under the assumption that some percentage of the population fits each archetype, and act accordingly to find the best response. For example, in the Guess 2/3 of the average described below, a player might believe that half the players are level-zero, and half are level-one. This player would select a number about halfway between the guesses of the archetypal level-one and level-two players. It is also argued that if the players are able to believe that there are others that can do the same level of reasoning, leading to an inclusive cognitive hierarchy, the framework could be helpful in capturing behavior games (e.g., expansive games) that are not dominance-solvable.

== Examples ==
=== The Guess 2/3 of the average game ===
In the Guess 2/3 of the average game, participants are asked to choose a number that will be as close as possible to some fraction of the average of all participants' guesses. Suppose there are many players, each attempting to guess ½ of the average from the range 1-100.

A level zero player will select a number non-strategically. That number might be selected at random, or may have special significance to the player (in which case it is indistinguishable from a random number by other players).

A level one player will choose the number consistent with the belief that all other players are level zero. If all other players in the game are level zero, the average of those guesses would be about 50. Therefore, a level one player will choose 25.

A level two player will choose the number consistent with the belief that all other players are level one. Since a level one player will choose 25, a level two player should choose 13. This process repeats for higher-level players.

=== The centipede game ===
In the centipede game, two players take turns choosing either to expand a slowly increasing pot, or to end the game and keep a larger fraction of the pot. In this example, the players are Alice and Bob. Alice chooses first, and also has the highest reward if Bob chooses to expand the pot on the final round.

If Alice is non-strategic (level zero), she will compare the payoffs at each possible endpoint of the game and note that her highest reward results from Bob expanding the pot on the final round. Alice will thus choose to expand the pot at every turn.

If Alice is level one, she will correctly identify her optimal outcome. However, she will also note that this outcome is not feasible because Bob's optimal outcome results from him ending the game on his last turn, rather than expanding the pot. As a result, she will choose to end the game on her last round rather than expanding the pot.

If Alice is level two, she will predict that Bob expects her to end the game on her last round, and will try to end the game just before she does. As a result, Alice will choose to end the game on her second to last round.

== Comparison to standard theory and experimental evidence ==
Theories of behavior often assume that players think strategically, meaning that players will base their actions on the probable decisions of other players in a way that will serve their objectives. However, many games, both real and contrived, do not result in the equilibrium predicted by standard analytic methods.

The standard solution to the Keynesian Beauty Contest is determined by iterated elimination of dominated strategies. Using the example above, a fully rational player will observe that the most the number could be is 50. This player will also predict that the other players know that as well and will behave accordingly, so the maximum feasible number becomes 25. But, again, other players should know that, too. This process repeats indefinitely, and concludes with all players selecting 0, the Nash equilibrium for this game.

This solution is inconsistent with experimental evidence, which finds that most players choose numbers around either 25 or 13. These guesses are consistent with first- and second-order depth of reasoning, supporting CHT. A small proportion of players exhibit depths of reasoning greater than second order.

The standard solution to the centipede game is determined by backward induction. According to this method, if Bob reaches his final decision, he will prefer to keep a larger share of a smaller pot to the smaller share of a larger pot, so he will end the game instead of expanding the pot. Alice knows that Bob will end the game on his last move, so she decides to end the game one step before then. However, Bob knows that Alice will end early, so he decides to end just before she does. This process repeats until Alice is confronted with her decision on the first round; knowing that Bob will end the game at the first opportunity, Alice ends the game on the first round, and they walk home with the smallest possible total payoff.

Thus, standard analytic methods predict that all players will defect as soon as they have the opportunity, despite the higher payoffs that would accrue to more cooperative play. In actual experimental settings, however, cooperative behavior is observed, but only for a limited number of rounds. While the benefits to cooperation persist (and in fact grow), most games end prematurely, with the defection of a player who had previously been cooperative.

== Comparison to alternative models ==
Many alternative models have been proposed to explain the discrepancies between standard theory and experimental results. For example, the temporary cooperation in the centipede game has been ascribed to altruism and either error or the anticipation of errors by players. In the case of altruism, a player opposed by an altruist will cooperate temporarily to increase the size of the payoff, with the intention of defecting later. In the case of error, a player does not appreciate the vulnerabilities created by cooperative play. If a player anticipates that the opponent is prone to making such errors, it will be in that player's interest to cooperate until just before the opponent recognizes the error.

While these alternative explanations are descriptive and plausible, they are also non-predictive and non-falsifiable, which limits their usefulness as behavioral models. They are also speculative: given an observation that deviates from a prediction, economists are unable to distinguish between errors, social preferences, intentional strategies, or other causes.

Cognitive Hierarchy Theory explains the observed pattern of opportunistic cooperation found in many games, without being susceptible to speculation about players' traits, such as intelligence or motivations. In the centipede game, the eventual defection of most players signifies that most players are strategic and non-altruistic. This suggests that players cooperate on a temporary basis because they are seeking their own self-interest, and only cooperate as long as they expect it to serve them, suggesting that CHT describes human behavior better than these alternatives. Furthermore, because researchers are able to preserve the common assumption that players are self-interested, CHT can be incorporated into existing models rather than replacing them outright.

CHT can offer reasonably accurate predictions about human behavior while acknowledging stronger forms of bounded rationality and opportunism than standard theory. Unlike methods such as backwards induction, it does not assume that players possess an unrealistically developed ability to process information, especially under conditions of uncertainty, dependence on other players, and time constraints. Furthermore, by incorporating stronger assumptions of opportunism, it is able to explain why a player will cooperate and then defect, instead of consistent cooperation or defection.

== See also ==
- Social cognition
