= Quick Response Engine =

Planning and scheduling program

Quick Response Engine was a planning and scheduling program developed for the OS/400 platform. The program was developed by the Acacia Technologies division of Computer Associates in 1996. In 2002 the group was sold to SSA Global Technologies.
