= Siren Painter =

Unidentified ancient Greek vase painter

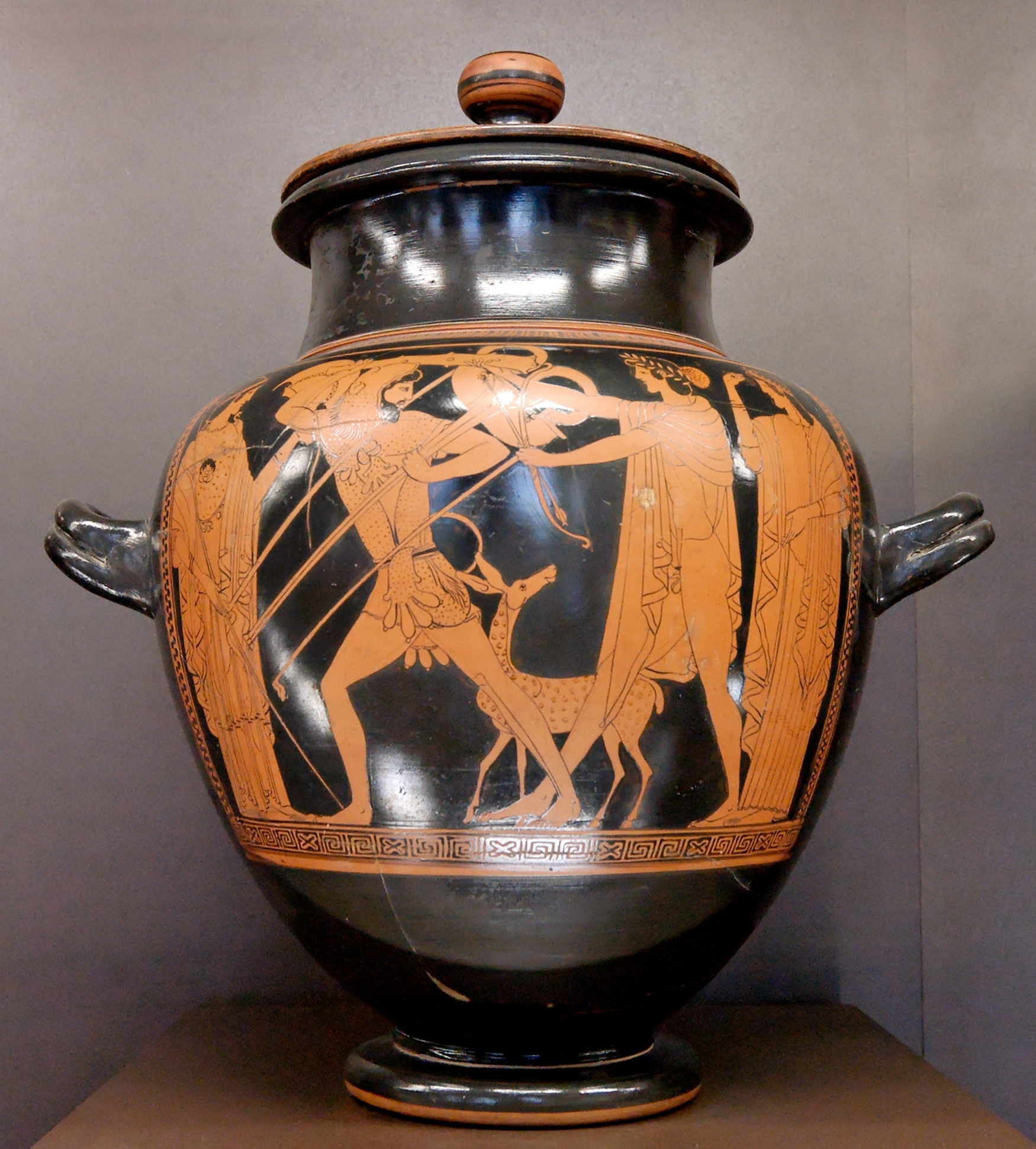
The struggle between Herakles and Apollo for the Delphic tripod (Louvre)

Siren painter is the name given to an ancient Greek artist who decorated but did not sign Attic red-figured vases. His real name is unknown, as are the date of his birth and death.

Following usual practice, this artist's name was derived from the subject of one of his artworks, a red-figured stamnos which illustrates a scene from Homer’s Odyssey (XII, 39): Odysseus is tied to the mast of his ship when he is passing along the island of the Sirens, dangerous bird-women.

The Siren painter was presumably working in Athens in the years 480 to 470 BC.

Some of his preserved vases are on public display:

- London, British Museum: Odysseus and the Sirens. c. 480–470 BC.
- Paris, Musée du Louvre: The struggle between Herakles and Apollo for the Delphic tripod, c. 480 BC.
