= Rosemarie Nagel =

German economist (born 1963)

Rosemarie Chariklia Nagel (born 1963) is a German economist specializing in experimental economics and neuroeconomics, especially focusing on their applications in macroeconomics and game theory, and including experiments based on Keynesian beauty contests. She works in Barcelona as an ICREA Research professor at Pompeu Fabra University and as a research professor at the Barcelona School of Economics.

== Education and career ==
Nagel was born in 1963 in Essen. She studied economics at the University of Bonn, earning a diploma in 1989. After a year abroad at the London School of Economics, she completed a doctorate (Dr. rer. pol.) in economics at the University of Bonn in 1994, supervised by Reinhard Selten.

After postdoctoral research in the US at the University of Pittsburgh, working with Alvin E. Roth, she joined Pompeu Fabra University as an assistant professor in 1995. She became an associate professor in 2002, a full professor in 2006, and an ICREA Research professor in 2007. In 2017 she added an affiliation as a research professor at the Barcelona School of Economics.

== Recognition ==
Nagel was elected as a Fellow of the Econometric Society in 2022.
