= Thomas Schelling =

American economist (1921–2016)

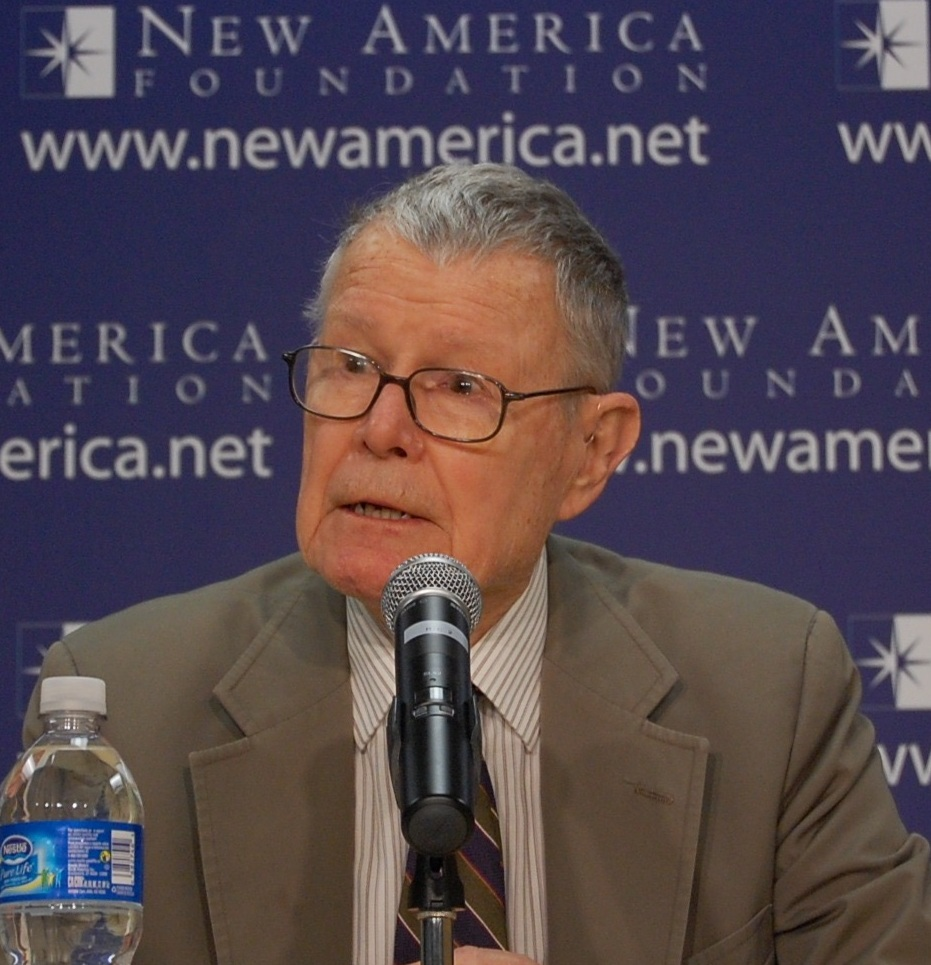
- Schelling in 2010
- Born: Thomas Crombie Schelling; April 14, 1921; Oakland, California, U.S.
- Died: December 13, 2016 (aged 95); Bethesda, Maryland, U.S.

Academic background
- Education: University of California, Berkeley (BA); Harvard University (PhD)
- Thesis: National income behavior: An introduction to algebraic analysis (1951)
- Doctoral advisor: Arthur Smithies; Wassily Leontief; James Duesenberry
- Influences: Carl von Clausewitz, Niccolò Machiavelli

Academic work
- Discipline: Game theory
- Institutions: Yale University; Harvard University; University of Maryland; New England Complex Systems Institute
- Doctoral students: A. Michael Spence; Eli Noam; Tyler Cowen
- Notable ideas: Focal point Egonomics
- Awards: The Frank E. Seidman Distinguished Award in Political Economy (1977); Nobel Memorial Prize in Economic Sciences (2005)
- Website: Information at IDEAS / RePEc

Thomas Crombie Schelling (April 14, 1921 – December 13, 2016) was an American economist and professor of foreign policy, national security, nuclear strategy, and arms control at the School of Public Policy at the University of Maryland, College Park. He was also co-faculty at the New England Complex Systems Institute.

Schelling was awarded the 2005 Nobel Memorial Prize in Economic Sciences (shared with Robert Aumann) for "having enhanced our understanding of conflict and cooperation through game theory analysis."

== Biography ==
=== Early years ===
Schelling was born on April 14, 1921, in Oakland, California. He graduated from San Diego High School. He received his bachelor's degree in economics from the University of California, Berkeley, in 1944 and received his PhD in economics from Harvard University in 1951.

=== Career ===
Schelling served with the Marshall Plan in Europe, the White House, and the Executive Office of the President from 1948 to 1953. He wrote most of his dissertation on national income behavior working at night while in Europe. He left government to join the economics faculty at Yale University.

In 1956, "he joined the RAND Corporation as an adjunct fellow, becoming a full-time researcher for a year after leaving Yale, and returning to adjunct status through 2002." In 1958 Schelling was appointed professor of economics at Harvard. That same year, he "co-founded the Center for International Affairs, which was [later] renamed the Weatherhead Center for International Affairs."

In 1969, Schelling joined Harvard's John F. Kennedy School of Government, where he was the Lucius N. Littauer Professor of Political Economy. He was among the "founding fathers" of the "modern" Kennedy School, as he helped to shift the curriculum's emphasis away from administration and more toward leadership.

Between 1994 and 1999, he conducted research at the International Institute for Applied Systems Analysis (IIASA), in Laxenburg, Austria.

In 1990, he left Harvard and joined the University of Maryland School of Public Policy and the University of Maryland Department of Economics. In 1991, he accepted the presidency of the American Economic Association, an organization of which he was also a Distinguished Fellow.

In 1995, he accepted the presidency of the Eastern Economic Association.

Schelling was a contributing participant of the Copenhagen Consensus.

=== Personal life and death ===
Schelling was married to Corinne Tigay Saposs from 1947 to 1991, with whom he had four sons. Later in 1991 he married Alice M. Coleman, who brought two sons to the marriage; they became his stepsons.

Schelling died on December 13, 2016, in Bethesda, Maryland, from complications following a hip fracture at the age of 95.

== Honors and awards ==
In 1977, Schelling received The Frank E. Seidman Distinguished Award in Political Economy.

In 1993, he was awarded the Award for Behavior Research Relevant to the Prevention of Nuclear War from the National Academy of Sciences.

He received honorary doctorates from Erasmus University Rotterdam in 2003, Yale University in 2009, and RAND Graduate School of Public Analysis, as well as an honorary degree from the University of Manchester in 2010.

He was awarded the 2005 Nobel Memorial Prize in Economic Sciences, along with Robert Aumann, for "having enhanced our understanding of conflict and cooperation through game-theory analysis."

In 2008 he was the Witten Lecturer at the Witten/Herdecke University as the awardee of the Witten Lectures in Economics and Philosophy.

Schelling's family auctioned his Nobel award medal, fetching $187,000. They donated this money to the Southern Poverty Law Center, an American 501 nonprofit legal advocacy organization specializing in civil rights and public interest litigation. Alice Schelling said her late husband had credited Smoky the Cowhorse by Will James, the winner of the Newbery Medal in 1927, as the most influential book he had read.

== Notable works ==
=== The Strategy of Conflict (1960) ===
The Strategy of Conflict, which Schelling published in 1960, pioneered the study of bargaining and strategic behavior in what he refers to as "conflict behavior." The Times Literary Supplement in 1995 ranked it as one of the 100 most influential books in the 50 years since 1945. In this book Schelling introduced concepts such as the "focal point" and "credible commitment." In a 1961 review, International Relations scholar Morton Kaplan described the book as a "strikingly original contribution" and a "landmark in the literature."

Schelling's book comprised a series of scholarly journal articles that he had published over the period 1957–1960.

Schelling encourages in his work a strategic view toward conflict that is equally "rational" and "successful." He believes that conflict cannot be based merely on one's intelligence but must also address the "advantages" associated with a course of action. He considers that the advantages that are gleaned should be firmly fixed in a value system that is both "explicit" and "consistent."

Also, conflict has a distinct meaning. In Schelling's approach, it is not enough to defeat an opponent, but one must also seize opportunities to co-operate of which there are usually many. He points out that it is only on the rarest of occasions, in what is known as "pure conflict," that the participants' interests are implacably opposed. He uses the example of "a war of complete extermination" to illustrate this phenomenon.

Co-operation, if available, may take many forms and thus potentially involve everything from "deterrence, limited war, and disarmament" to "negotiation." Indeed, it is through such actions that participants are left with less of a conflict and more of a "bargaining situation." The bargaining itself is best thought of in terms of the other participant's actions, as any gains one might realize are highly dependent upon the "choices or decisions" of their opponent.

Communication between parties, though, is another matter entirely. Verbal or written communication is known as "explicit," and involves such activities as "offering concessions." What happens, though, when this type of communication becomes impossible or improbable? This is when something called "tacit maneuvers" become important. Think of this as action-based communication. Schelling uses the example of one's occupation or evacuation of strategic territory to illustrate this latter communication method.

In an article celebrating Schelling's Nobel Memorial Prize for Economics, Michael Kinsley, Washington Post op‑ed columnist and one of Schelling's former students, anecdotally summarizes Schelling's reorientation of game theory thus: "[Y]ou're standing at the edge of a cliff, chained by the ankle to someone else. You'll be released, and one of you will get a large prize, as soon as the other gives in. How do you persuade the other guy to give in, when the only method at your disposal—threatening to push him off the cliff—would doom you both? Answer: You start dancing, closer and closer to the edge. That way, you don't have to convince him that you would do something totally irrational: plunge him and yourself off the cliff. You just have to convince him that you are prepared to take a higher risk than he is of accidentally falling off the cliff. If you can do that, you win."

=== Arms and Influence (1966) ===
Schelling's theories about war were extended in Arms and Influence, published in 1966. According to the publisher, the book "carries forward the analysis so brilliantly begun in his earlier The Strategy of Conflict (1960) and Strategy and Arms Control (with Morton Halperin, 1961), and makes a significant contribution to the growing literature on modern war and diplomacy." Chapter headings include The Diplomacy of Violence, The Diplomacy of Ultimate Survival and The Dynamics of Mutual Alarm.

Within the work, Schelling discusses military capabilities and how they can be used as bargaining power. Instead of considering only the choices that are available on a surface level, one can think ahead to try to influence the other party to come to the desired conclusion. Specifically, Schelling mentions the actions taken by the U.S. during the Cuban and Berlin crises and how they functioned as not only preparation for war but also signals. For example, Schelling points out that the bombing of North Vietnam "is as much coercive as tactical." Not only was the bombing to cripple their enemies armies, but it also served to bring Vietnam to the table for negotiations. Much of this writing was influenced largely due to Schelling's personal interest in Game Theory and its application to nuclear armaments.

Schelling's work influenced Robert Jervis.

=== Micromotives and Macrobehavior (1978) ===
In 1969 and 1971, Schelling published widely cited articles dealing with racial dynamics and what he termed "a general theory of tipping." In those papers, he showed that a preference that one's neighbors be of the same color, or even a preference for a mixture "up to some limit," can lead to total segregation. He thus argued that motives, malicious or not, were indistinguishable as to explaining the phenomenon of complete local separation of distinct groups. He used coins on graph paper to demonstrate his theory by placing pennies and dimes in different patterns on the "board" and then moving them one by one if they were in an "unhappy" situation.

Schelling's dynamics has been cited as a way of explaining variations that are found in what are regarded as meaningful differences – gender, age, race, ethnicity, language, sexual preference, and religion. A cycle of such change, once it has begun, may have a self-sustaining momentum. Schelling's 1978 book Micromotives and Macrobehavior expanded on and generalized those themes and is often cited in the literature of agent-based computational economics.

== Global warming ==
Schelling was involved in the global warming debate since chairing a commission for President Jimmy Carter in 1980. He believed climate change poses a serious threat to developing nations, but that the threat to the United States was exaggerated. He wrote that,

Today, little of our gross domestic product is produced outdoors, and therefore, little is susceptible to climate. Agriculture and forestry are less than 3 percent of total output, and little else is much affected. Even if agricultural productivity declined by a third over the next half-century, the per capita GNP we might have achieved by 2050 we would still achieve in 2051. Considering that agricultural productivity in most parts of the world continues to improve (and that many crops may benefit directly from enhanced photosynthesis due to increased carbon dioxide), it is not at all certain that the net impact on agriculture will be negative or much noticed in the developed world.

Drawing on his experience with the Marshall Plan after World War II, he argued that addressing global warming is a bargaining problem: if the world were able to reduce emissions, poor countries would receive most of the benefits, but rich countries would bear most of the costs.

== Contributions to popular culture ==
Stanley Kubrick read an article Schelling wrote that included a description of the Peter George novel Red Alert, and conversations between Kubrick, Schelling, and George eventually led to the 1964 movie Dr. Strangelove or: How I Learned to Stop Worrying and Love the Bomb.

Schelling is also cited for the first known use of the phrase collateral damage in his May 1961 article Dispersal, Deterrence, and Damage.

In his book Choice and Consequence, he explored various topics such as nuclear terrorism, blackmail, daydreaming, and euthanasia, from a behavioral economics point of view.

== Books ==
- The Strategy of Conflict. Harvard University Press, Cambridge 1960
- Arms and influence. Greenwood Press, Westview, Conn. 1976, ISBN 0-8371-8980-2.
- Choice and consequence [Perspectives of an errant economist]. Harvard University Press, Cambridge, Mass. 1984, ISBN 0-674-12770-6.
- Strategy and arms control. (with Morton H. Halperin): Pergamon Press, New York 1985, ISBN 0-08-032391-X.
- Micromotives and macrobehavior. New ed. Norton, New York 2006, ISBN 0-393-32946-1.
- Strategies of commitment and other essays. Harvard University Press, Cambridge, Mass. 2006, ISBN 978-0-674-01929-4.

== See also ==
- Brinkmanship
- Egonomics
- Focal point (game theory) (Schelling point)
- Hobbesian trap (Schelling's dilemma)
- Internality
- Precommitment
- Strategic realism
- Vicarious problem-solving

Awards
Preceded by Finn E. Kydland; Edward C. Prescott	Laureate of the Nobel Memorial Prize in Economics; 2005; Served alongside: Robert Aumann	Succeeded by Edmund Phelps
