= Thomas Palfrey =

American economist (born 1953)

Academic background
- Education: University of Michigan (BA, MA); California Institute of Technology (PhD)

Academic work
- Discipline: Game theory; Experimental economics
- Institutions: California Institute of Technology
- Awards: Fellow of the Econometric Society; Fellow of the American Academy of Arts and Sciences

Thomas Rossman Palfrey (born 1953) is the Flintridge Professor of Economics and Political Science at the California Institute of Technology (Caltech) in Pasadena, California, and Fellow of the Econometric Society. He received his Ph.D. in Social Science from Caltech in 1981.

He has authored influential papers in the fields of political economy ("Voter Participation and Strategic Uncertainty" with Howard Rosenthal, APSR 1985), game theory ("Quantal Response Equilibria in Normal Form Games" with Richard McKelvey, GEB 1995), implementation ("Nash Implementation Using Undominated Strategies" with S. Srivastava, Econometrica 1991), and experimental economics ("An Experimental Study of the Centipede Game" with R. McKelvey, Econometrica 1992).
