= Precommitment =

Concept in behavioral economics

In psychology, precommitment is a strategy or a method of self-control that a person or organisation may use to restrict the number of choices available to them at a future time. Precommitment may also involve imposing obstacles or additional costs to certain courses of action in advance. Agents may precommit themselves when they predict that their preferences will change but wish to ensure that their future actions will align with their current preferences.

Precommitment has been studied as a bargaining strategy in which agents bind themselves to one course of action in order to enhance the credibility of present threats. Some scholars have proposed that collective political groups may also engage in precommitment by adopting constitutions that limit the scope of future legislation.

== Background ==
In two unrelated articles, both published in 1956, Thomas Schelling and R.H. Strotz introduced the concept of precommitment to the study of strategic bargaining and consumer behavior, respectively. Schelling later included an expanded version of this essay in his 1960 work The Strategy of Conflict, explaining precommitment as part of his deterrence theory, where it is said to influence other parties in a bargaining situation. He detailed that a party can exert power over another or achieve more of his aims by adopting rules that restrict available options.

Schelling argued that a negotiator may voluntarily limit the options available to them in the future in order to make his current offer or threat more credible. This can also be achieved by voluntarily raising the cost of a future action for oneself, even if that action is not precluded absolutely. For example, a general may burn the bridges behind his army to preclude the possibility of retreat, thereby increasing the credibility of his threat to stand and fight.

Unlike Schelling, Strotz was not concerned with the uses of precommitment in bargaining situations. Rather, for Strotz, precommitment was a strategy which an agent might use to impose his current intentions upon a myopic future self. In the epigraph to his article on the subject, Strotz connects his theory of precommitment to the story of Ulysses and the Sirens from The Odyssey.

== Elster's theory ==
Jon Elster first developed a theory of precommitment, which he also calls self-binding, in his 1979 work Ulysses and the Sirens. Here, he argues that precommitment is a device that human agents use to overcome the problem of imperfect rationality: Human beings are imperfectly rational because they are capable of rational planning but are prone to deviate from these plans because of weakness of will. Recognizing their vulnerability to imperious passions, human agents precommit themselves to "[achieve] rationality by indirect means."

Elaborating upon Strotz's reference to The Odyssey, Elster takes the story of Ulysses and the Sirens to be a paradigmatic case of precommitment, referring to precommitment as "the Ulysses problem." On the basis of a warning from his erstwhile lover Circe, Ulysses instructs his sailors to bind him to the mast of his ship and block their own ears before sailing past the island of the Sirens, whose enchanting song draws sailors to shipwreck. Thus, foreseeing his own weakness of will, Ulysses guards against the temptation of the Sirens. A more mundane example that Elster uses is that of a smoker who tells her friends about her intention to quit in order to raise the cost of backsliding. Having broadcast her intention to quit, a return to cigarettes would now damage her reputation or, at least, induce snide remarks from her friends.

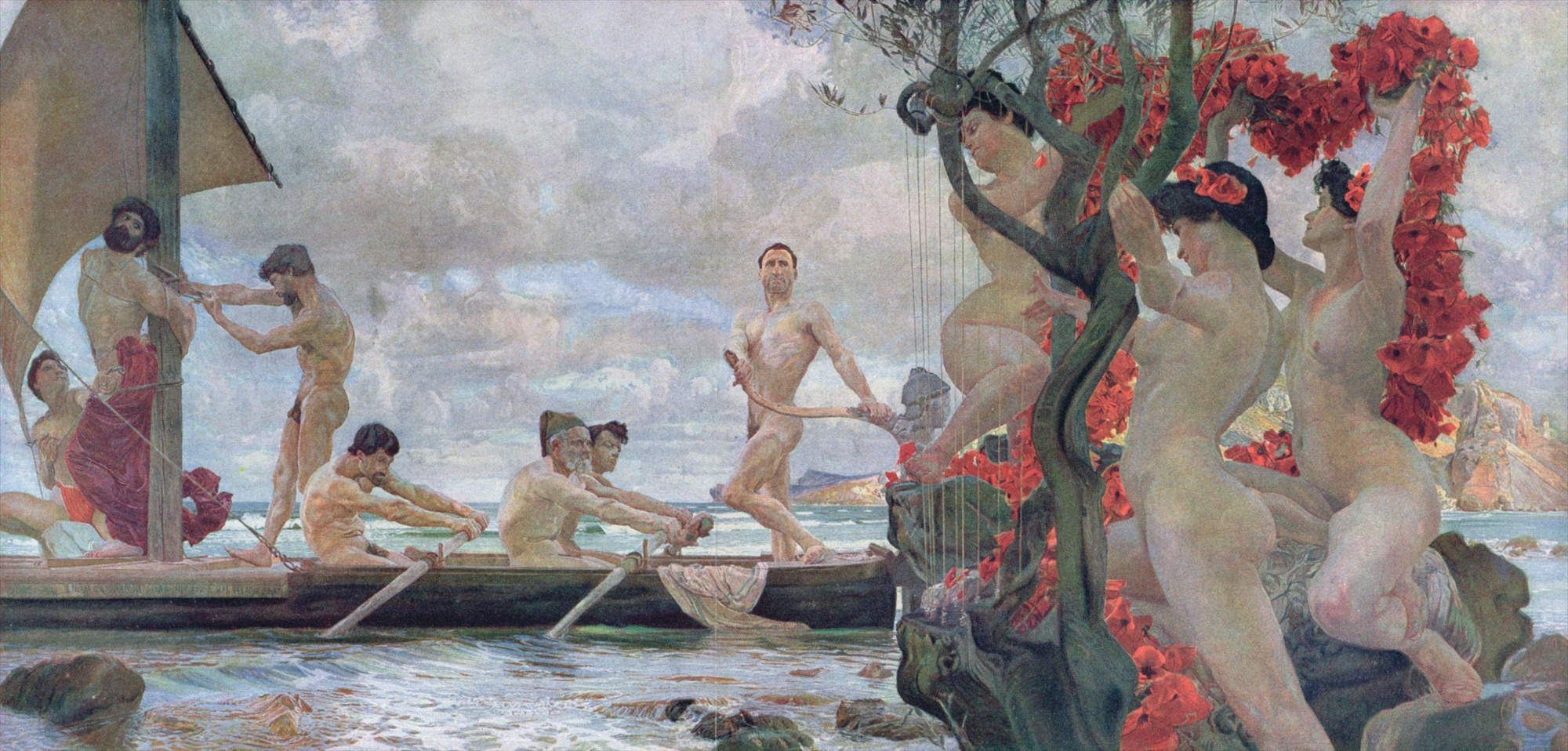
Otto Greiner, Odysseus und die Sirenen.

In Ulysses and the Sirens, Elster also applies his theory of precommitment to the domain of politics. Elster starts with the assertion that a direct democracy will tend to reverse its own decisions and to display inconsistent preferences over time. On this basis, Elster goes on to argue that certain institutions in modern democracies may be considered precommitment devices. A democratic electorate may bind itself as a way of "protecting itself against its own impulsiveness." The establishment of central banks, he argues, can be interpreted as an act of precommitment on the part of an electorate seeking to preempt the impulse to meddle with interest rates. Elster argues that a people may similarly bind itself through a constitution that entrusts certain powers to the judiciary and requires supermajorities to change certain clauses. By doing so, the people guards itself against its own irrationality at a future time. This, Elster says, is "the Ulysses strategy" in domain of politics.

Elster elaborates upon his theory of precommitment in his 2000 work Ulysses Unbound. Here, he develops a typology of individual precommitment strategies, drawing on examples from French literature and from contemporary studies of addiction. In the second part of this work, Elster partially repudiates his earlier application of precommitment to the domain of politics. He argues here that constitutions are often devised with the goal of binding others (e.g. future majorities), not their makers.

== See also ==
- Commitment device
- Sour Grapes
