= Richard McKelvey =

Political scientist

Richard D. McKelvey
- Born: April 27, 1944; Geneva, New York
- Died: April 22, 2002 (aged 57); Pasadena, California
- Education: University of Rochester; Washington University in St. Louis; Oberlin College
- Scientific career
- Fields: Political science
- Workplaces: California Institute of Technology

Richard Drummond McKelvey (April 27, 1944 – April 22, 2002) was a political scientist, specializing in mathematical theories of voting. He received his BS in Mathematics from Oberlin College, MA in mathematics from Washington University in St. Louis, and PhD in political science from University of Rochester. He was an Econometric Society fellow, and was the Edie and Lew Wasserman Professor of Political Science at the California Institute of Technology until his death, from cancer, in 2002.

McKelvey also wrote several articles about instability. One discussed the topic agenda manipulation. The McKelvey theorem indicates that almost every possible outcome can be realized through democratic decision-making, by smartly choosing the order or agenda in which decisions are taken. The desired result is established by ensuring that in each stage another composition of the majority determines the outcome of that part of the decision-making procedure. The person who designs the decision-making procedure needs to know the preferences of the participants to achieve the most desirable outcome by shifting majorities. It will be clear that the position where one can control the agenda is attractive because it is possible to implement one's choice.

In 2007 John Aldrich (Duke), James Alt (Harvard) and Arthur Lupia (Michigan) published the edited volume Positive Changes in Political Science: The Legacy of Richard D. McKelvey’s Most Influential Writings with the University of Michigan Press. The volume contains reprints of several of Richard McKelvey's classic papers along with original essays by leading names in political science.

== Publications ==
- McKelvey, Richard; Palfrey, Thomas (1995), "Quantal Response Equilibria for Normal Form Games", Games and Economic Behavior, 10: 6–38, CiteSeerX 10.1.1.30.5152, doi:10.1006/game.1995.1023
- McKelvey, Richard; Palfrey, Thomas (1998), "Quantal Response Equilibria for Extensive Form Games" (PDF), Experimental Economics, 1: 9–41, doi:10.1007/BF01426213
