= Wisdom of the crowd =

Collective perception of a group of people

"Wisdom of the crowd" or "wisdom of the majority" expresses the notion that the collective opinion of a diverse and independent group of individuals (rather than that of a single expert) yields the best judgement. This concept, while not new to the Information Age, has been pushed into the spotlight by social information sites such as Quora, Reddit, Stack Exchange, Wikipedia, Yahoo! Answers, and other web resources which rely on collective human knowledge. An explanation for this supposition is that the idiosyncratic noise associated with each individual judgment is replaced by an average of that noise taken over a large number of responses, tempering the effect of the noise.

Trial by jury can be understood as at least partly relying on wisdom of the crowd, compared to bench trial which relies on one or a few experts. In politics, sometimes sortition is held as an example of what wisdom of the crowd would look like. Decision-making would happen by a diverse group instead of by a fairly homogenous political group or party. Research in cognitive science has sought to model the relationship between wisdom of the crowd effects and individual cognition.

A large group's aggregated answers to questions involving quantity estimation, general world knowledge, and spatial reasoning have generally been found to be as good as, but often superior to, the answers given by any of the individuals within the group.

Jury theorems from social choice theory provide formal arguments for wisdom of the crowd given a variety of more or less plausible assumptions. Both the assumptions and the conclusions remain controversial, even though the theorems themselves are not. The oldest and simplest is Condorcet's jury theorem (1785).

== Examples ==
Aristotle is credited as the first person to write about the "wisdom of the crowd" in his work Politics. According to Aristotle, "it is possible that the many, though not individually good men, yet when they come together may be better, not individually but collectively, than those who are so, just as public dinners to which many contribute are better than those supplied at one man's cost".

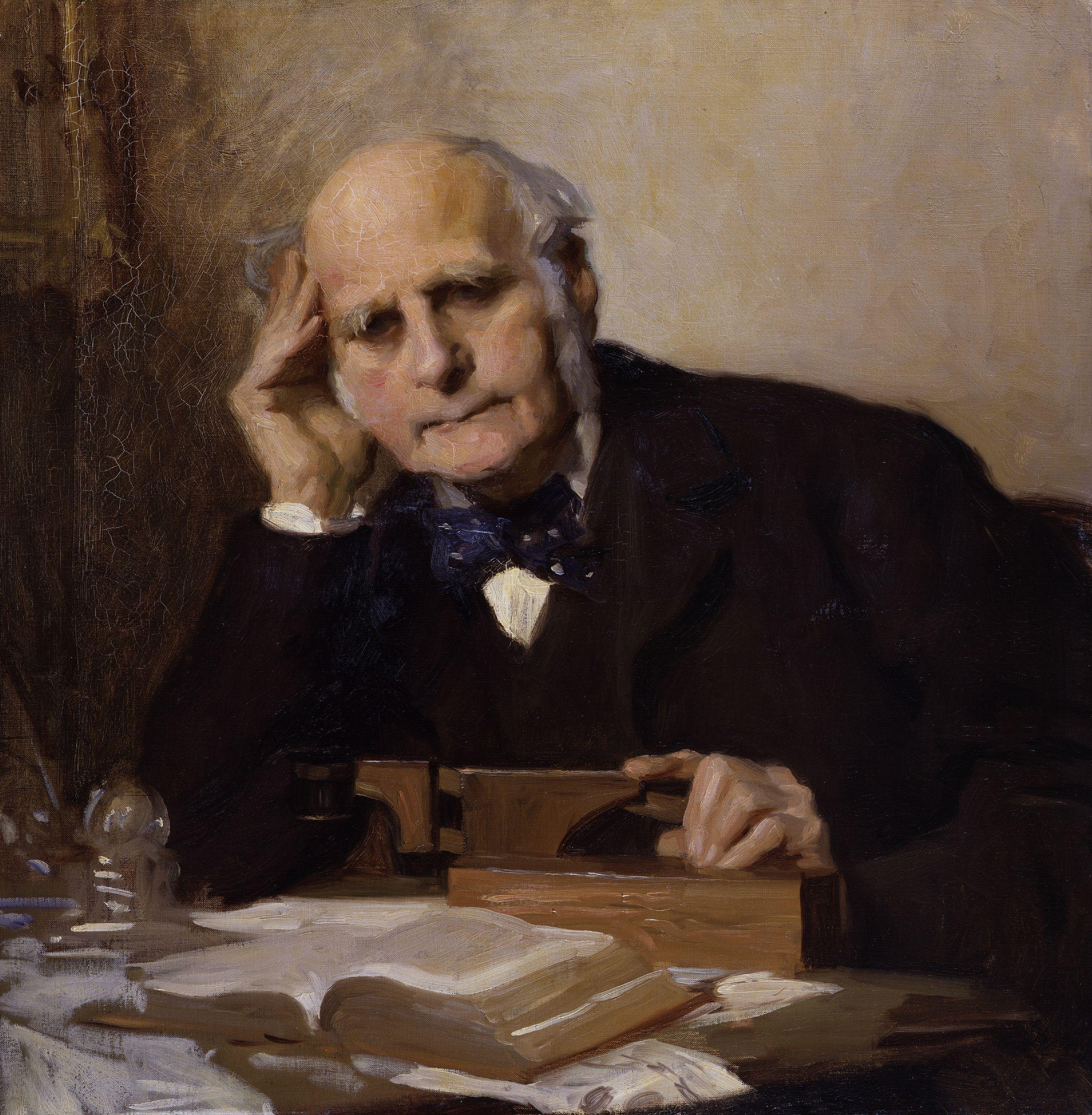
Sir Francis Galton by Charles Wellington Furse, given to the National Portrait Gallery, London in 1954

The classic wisdom-of-the-crowds finding involves point estimation of a continuous quantity. At a 1906 country fair in Plymouth, 800 people participated in a contest to estimate the weight of a slaughtered and dressed ox. Statistician Francis Galton observed that the median guess, 1207 pounds, was accurate within 1% of the true weight of 1198 pounds. This has contributed to the insight in cognitive science that a crowd's individual judgments can be modeled as a probability distribution of responses with the median centered near the true value of the quantity to be estimated.

In recent years, the "wisdom of the crowd" phenomenon has been leveraged in business strategy, advertising spaces, and also political research. Marketing firms aggregate consumer feedback and brand impressions for clients. Meanwhile, companies such as Trada invoke crowds to design advertisements based on clients' requirements. Lastly, political preferences are aggregated to predict or nowcast political elections.

== Higher-dimensional problems and modeling ==
Although classic wisdom-of-the-crowds findings center on point estimates of single continuous quantities, the phenomenon also scales up to higher-dimensional problems that do not lend themselves to aggregation methods such as taking the mean. More complex models have been developed for these purposes. A few examples of higher-dimensional problems that exhibit wisdom-of-the-crowds effects include:

- Combinatorial problems such as minimum spanning trees and the traveling salesman problem, in which participants must find the shortest route between an array of points. Models of these problems either break the problem into common pieces (the local decomposition method of aggregation) or find solutions that are most similar to the individual human solutions (the global similarity aggregation method).
- Ordering problems such as the order of the U.S. presidents or world cities by population. A useful approach in this situation is Thurstonian modeling, which gives each participant access to the ground truth ordering but with varying degrees of stochastic noise, leading to variance in the final ordering given by different individuals.
- Multi-armed bandit problems, in which participants choose from a set of alternatives with fixed but unknown reward rates to maximize return after a number of trials. To accommodate mixtures of decision processes and individual differences in probabilities of winning and staying with a given alternative versus losing and shifting to another alternative, hierarchical Bayesian models have been employed which include parameters for individual people drawn from Gaussian distributions.

== Surprisingly popular ==
In further exploring the ways to improve the results, a new technique called the "surprisingly popular" was developed by scientists at MIT's Sloan Neuroeconomics Lab in collaboration with Princeton University. For a given question, people are asked to give two responses: What they think the right answer is and what they think popular opinion will be. The average difference between the two indicates the correct answer. It was found that the "surprisingly popular" algorithm reduces errors by 21.3 percent in comparison to simple majority votes, and by 24.2 percent in comparison to basic confidence-weighted votes where people express how confident they are of their answers and 22.2 percent compared to advanced confidence-weighted votes, where one only uses the answers with the highest average.

== Definition of crowd ==
In the context of wisdom of the crowd, the term crowd takes on a broad meaning. One definition characterizes a crowd as a group of people assembled by an open call for participation.

In the digital age, the potential for collective intelligence has expanded with the advent of information technologies and social media platforms such as Google, Facebook, Twitter, and others. These platforms enable the aggregation of opinions and knowledge on a massive scale, creating what some have defined as "intelligent communities." However, the effectiveness of these digital crowds can be compromised by issues such as demographic biases, the influence of highly active users, and the presence of bots, which can skew the diversity and independence necessary for a crowd to be truly wise. To mitigate these issues, researchers have suggested using a multi-media approach to aggregate intelligence from various platforms or employing factor analysis to filter out biases and noise.

While crowds are often leveraged in online applications, they can also be utilized in offline contexts. In some cases, members of a crowd may be offered monetary incentives for participation. Certain applications of "wisdom of the crowd", such as jury duty in the United States, mandate crowd participation.

== Analogues with individual cognition: the "crowd within" ==
The insight that crowd responses to an estimation task can be modeled as a sample from a probability distribution invites comparisons with individual cognition. In particular, individual cognition may be probabilistic in the sense that individual estimates are drawn from an "internal probability distribution." If this is the case, then two or more estimates of the same quantity from the same person should average to a value closer to ground truth than either of the individual judgments, since the effect of statistical noise within each of these judgments is reduced. This of course rests on the assumption that the noise associated with each judgment is (at least somewhat) statistically independent. Thus, the crowd needs to be independent but also diversified, in order to allow a variety of answers. The answers on the ends of the spectrum will cancel each other, allowing the wisdom of the crowd phenomenon to take its place. Another caveat is that individual probability judgments are often biased toward extreme values (e.g., 0 or 1). Thus any beneficial effect of multiple judgments from the same person is likely to be limited to samples from an unbiased distribution.

Vul and Pashler (2008) asked participants for point estimates of continuous quantities associated with general world knowledge, such as "What percentage of the world's airports are in the United States?" Without being alerted to the procedure in advance, half of the participants were immediately asked to make a second, different guess in response to the same question, and the other half were asked to do this three weeks later. The average of a participant's two guesses was more accurate than either individual guess. Furthermore, the averages of guesses made in the three-week delay condition were more accurate than guesses made in immediate succession. One explanation of this effect is that guesses in the immediate condition were less independent of each other (an anchoring effect) and were thus subject to (some of) the same kind of noise. In general, these results suggest that individual cognition may indeed be subject to an internal probability distribution characterized by stochastic noise, rather than consistently producing the best answer based on all the knowledge a person has. These results were mostly confirmed in a high-powered pre-registered replication. The only result that was not fully replicated was that a delay in the second guess generates a better estimate.

Hourihan and Benjamin (2010) tested the hypothesis that the estimated improvements observed by Vul and Pashler in the delayed responding condition were the result of increased independence of the estimates. To do this Hourihan and Benjamin capitalized on variations in memory span among their participants. In support they found that averaging repeated estimates of those with lower memory spans showed greater estimate improvements than averaging the repeated estimates of those with larger memory spans.

Rauhut and Lorenz (2011) expanded on this research by again asking participants to make estimates of continuous quantities related to real-world knowledge. In this case participants were informed that they would make five consecutive estimates. This approach allowed the researchers to determine, firstly, the number of times one needs to ask oneself in order to match the accuracy of asking others and then, the rate at which estimates made by oneself improve estimates compared to asking others. The authors concluded that asking oneself an infinite number of times does not surpass the accuracy of asking just one other individual. Overall, they found little support for a so-called "mental distribution" from which individuals draw their estimates; in fact, they found that in some cases asking oneself multiple times actually reduces accuracy. Ultimately, they argue that the results of Vul and Pashler (2008) overestimate the wisdom of the "crowd within" – as their results show that asking oneself more than three times actually reduces accuracy to levels below that reported by Vul and Pashler (who only asked participants to make two estimates).

Müller-Trede (2011) attempted to investigate the types of questions in which utilizing the "crowd within" is most effective. He found that while accuracy gains were smaller than would be expected from averaging one's estimates with another individual, repeated judgments led to increases in accuracy for both year estimation questions (e.g., when was the thermometer invented?) and questions about estimated percentages (e.g., what percentage of internet users connect from China?). General numerical questions (e.g., what is the speed of sound, in kilometers per hour?) did not improve with repeated judgments, while averaging individual judgments with those of a random other did improve accuracy. This, Müller-Trede argues, is the result of the bounds implied by year and percentage questions.

Van Dolder and Van den Assem (2018) studied the "crowd within" using a large database from three estimation competitions organised by Holland Casino. For each of these competitions, they find that within-person aggregation indeed improves accuracy of estimates. Furthermore, they also confirm that this method works better if there is a time delay between subsequent judgments. Even with considerable delay between estimates, between-person aggregation is more beneficial. The average of a large number of judgements from the same person is barely better than the average of two judgements from different people.

=== Dialectical bootstrapping: improving the estimates of the "crowd within" ===
Herzog and Hertwig (2009) attempted to improve on the "wisdom of many in one mind" (i.e., the "crowd within") by asking participants to use dialectical bootstrapping. Dialectical bootstrapping involves the use of dialectic (reasoned discussion that takes place between two or more parties with opposing views, in an attempt to determine the best answer) and bootstrapping (advancing oneself without the assistance of external forces). They posited that people should be able to make greater improvements on their original estimates by basing the second estimate on antithetical information. Therefore, these second estimates, based on different assumptions and knowledge than that used to generate the first estimate would also have a different error (both systematic and random) than the first estimate – increasing the accuracy of the average judgment. From an analytical perspective dialectical bootstrapping should increase accuracy so long as the dialectical estimate is not too far off and the errors of the first and dialectical estimates are different. To test this, Herzog and Hertwig asked participants to make a series of date estimations regarding historical events (e.g., when electricity was discovered), without knowledge that they would be asked to provide a second estimate. Next, half of the participants were simply asked to make a second estimate. The other half were asked to use a consider-the-opposite strategy to make dialectical estimates (using their initial estimates as a reference point). Specifically, participants were asked to imagine that their initial estimate was off, consider what information may have been wrong, what this alternative information would suggest, if that would have made their estimate an overestimate or an underestimate, and finally, based on this perspective what their new estimate would be. Results of this study revealed that while dialectical bootstrapping did not outperform the wisdom of the crowd (averaging each participant's first estimate with that of a random other participant), it did render better estimates than simply asking individuals to make two estimates.

Hirt and Markman (1995) found that participants need not be limited to a consider-the-opposite strategy to improve judgments. Researchers asked participants to consider an alternative – operationalized as any plausible alternative (rather than simply focusing on the "opposite" alternative) – finding that simply considering an alternative improved judgments.

Not all studies have shown support for the "crowd within" improving judgments. Ariely and colleagues asked participants to respond based on their answers to true-false items and their confidence in those answers. They found that while averaging judgment estimates between individuals significantly improved estimates, averaging repeated judgment estimates made by the same individuals did not significantly improve estimates.

== Challenges and solution approaches ==
Wisdom-of-the-crowds research routinely attributes the superiority of crowd averages over individual judgments to the elimination of individual noise, an explanation that assumes independence of the individual judgments from each other. Thus the crowd tends to make its best decisions if it is made up of diverse opinions and ideologies.

Averaging can eliminate random errors that affect each person's answer in a different way, but not systematic errors that affect the opinions of the entire crowd in the same way. For instance, a wisdom-of-the-crowd technique would not be expected to compensate for cognitive biases.

Scott E. Page introduced the diversity prediction theorem: "The squared error of the collective prediction equals the average squared error minus the predictive diversity". Therefore, when the diversity in a group is large, the error of the crowd is small.

Henning Piezunka and Oliver Schilke provide experimental evidence that people participating in the aggregation of opinions with the intent to leverage the wisdom of the crowd often do not share their sincere opinion, but engage in strategic voting.

Miller and Stevyers reduced the independence of individual responses in a wisdom-of-the-crowds experiment by allowing limited communication between participants. Participants were asked to answer ordering questions for general knowledge questions such as the order of U.S. presidents. For half of the questions, each participant started with the ordering submitted by another participant (and alerted to this fact), and for the other half, they started with a random ordering, and in both cases were asked to rearrange them (if necessary) to the correct order. Answers where participants started with another participant's ranking were on average more accurate than those from the random starting condition. Miller and Steyvers conclude that different item-level knowledge among participants is responsible for this phenomenon, and that participants integrated and augmented previous participants' knowledge with their own knowledge.

Crowds tend to work best when there is a correct answer to the question being posed, such as a question about geography or mathematics. When there is not a precise answer crowds can come to arbitrary conclusions. Wisdom-of-the-crowd algorithms thrive when individual responses exhibit proximity and a symmetrical distribution around the correct, albeit unknown, answer. This symmetry allows errors in responses to cancel each other out during the averaging process. Conversely, these algorithms may falter when the subset of correct answers is limited, failing to counteract random biases. This challenge is particularly pronounced in online settings where individuals, often with varying levels of expertise, respond anonymously. Some "wisdom-of-the-crowd" algorithms tackle this issue using expectation–maximization voting techniques. The wisdom-in-the-crowd (WICRO) algorithm offers a one-pass classification solution. It gauges the expertise level of individuals by assessing the relative "distance" between them. Specifically, the algorithm identifies experts by presuming that their responses will be relatively "closer" to each other when addressing questions within their field of expertise. This approach enhances the algorithm's ability to discern expertise levels in scenarios where only a small subset of participants possess proficiency in a given domain, mitigating the impact of potential biases that may arise during anonymous online interactions.

The wisdom of the crowd effect is easily undermined. Social influence can cause the average of the crowd's answers to be inaccurate, while the geometric mean and the median are more robust. This relies on knowing an individual's uncertainty and trust in their estimate. The average answer of individuals who are knowledgeable about a topic will vary from the average of individuals who know nothing of the topic. A simple average of knowledgeable and inexperienced opinions will be less accurate than one in which the weighting of the average is based on the uncertainty and trust of their answer.

Organizations that leverage the wisdom of the crowd may undermine the learning of their own members. When organizations make decisions leveraging the wisdom of the crowds, contrarian opinions are marginalized and not acted upon. Correspondingly, contrarian voters never receive feedback as their opinion is not turned into action.

Experiments run by the Swiss Federal Institute of Technology found that when a group of people was asked to answer a question together they would attempt to come to a consensus which would frequently cause the accuracy of the answer to decrease. One suggestion to counter this effect is to ensure that the group contains a population with diverse backgrounds.

Research from the Good Judgment Project showed that teams organized in prediction polls can avoid premature consensus and produce aggregate probability estimates that are more accurate than those produced in prediction markets.

== See also ==
- Argumentum ad populum and Tyranny of the majority
- Bandwagon effect and Groupthink
- Collaborative software and Open source
- Collective intelligence and Collective wisdom
- Conventional wisdom
- Crowdfunding
- Crowdsourcing
- Dispersed knowledge
- Dollar voting
- Dunning–Kruger effect
- Efficient-market hypothesis
- Emergence
- Forecasting
  - Delphi method
  - Ensemble forecasting
- Human reliability
- Law of large numbers
- Linus's law
- Monte Carlo method
- Networked expertise
- The Wisdom of Crowds
- Vox populi
