= Guess 2/3 of the average =

Mathematical game

In game theory, "guess 2/3 of the average" is a game where players simultaneously select a real number between 0 and 100, inclusive. The winner of the game is the player(s) who select a number closest to 2/3 of the average of numbers chosen by all players.

== History ==
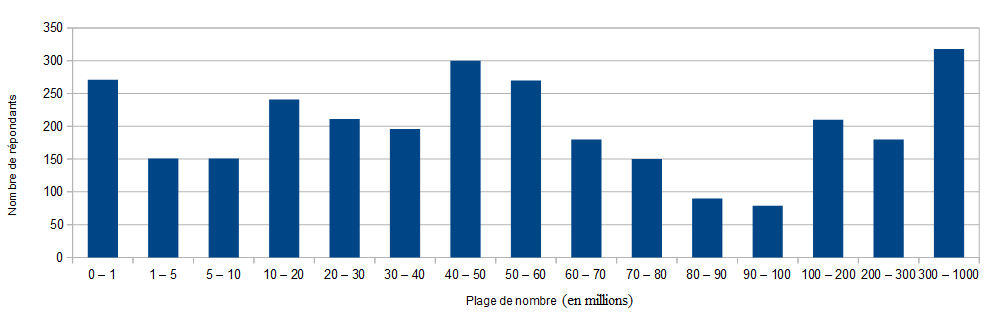
Distribution of the 2898 answers to 1983 tiebreaker Jeux et Stratégie contest.

Alain Ledoux is the founding father of the "guess 2/3 of the average" game. In 1981, Ledoux used this game as a tiebreaker in his French magazine Jeux et Stratégie. He asked about 4,000 readers, who reached the same number of points in previous puzzles, to state an integer between 1 and 1,000,000,000. The winner was the one who guessed closest to 2/3 of the average guess. Rosemarie Nagel (1995) revealed the potential of guessing games of that kind: They are able to disclose participants' "depth of reasoning."

== Equilibrium analysis ==
In this game, there is no strictly dominant strategy, but there are strongly dominated strategies. There is a unique pure strategy, Nash equilibrium. This equilibrium can be found by iterated elimination of weakly dominated strategies.

Guessing any number higher than 2/3 of what one expects others to guess on average cannot be part of a Nash equilibrium. The highest possible average that would occur if everyone guessed 100 is 2/3 × 100, that is, 66 + 2/3. Therefore, choosing a number that lies above 2/3 × 100 is strictly dominated for every player, and can thus be eliminated. Once these strategies are eliminated for every player, 2/3 × 100 becomes the new highest possible average (that is, if everyone chooses 2/3 × 100), therefore, any guess above 2/3 × 2/3 × 100, i.e. 44 + 4/9, is weakly dominated for every player, since no player will guess above 2/3 × 100. If the same group of people play the game consistently, this process of the highest possible logical answer repeatedly getting smaller will continue for each step as the logic is continually applied. Eventually, the average will move close to 0 as all other numbers above 0 have been eliminated. Once all players follow this logic and select 0, the game reaches its Nash equilibrium. At this state, every player has chosen to play the best response strategy for themselves, given what everyone else is choosing.

However, this degeneration does not occur in a similar way if choices are restricted to, for example, only the integers between 0 and 100. In this case, all integers except 0 and 1 vanish; it becomes advantageous to select 0 if one expects that at least 1/4 of all players will do so, and select 1 otherwise. In this way, it is the opposite of a "consensus game" where one wins by being in the majority.

== Rationality versus common knowledge of rationality ==
This game illustrates the difference between the perfect rationality of an actor and the common knowledge of the rationality of all players. To achieve its Nash equilibrium of 0, this game requires all players to be perfectly rational, rationality to be common knowledge, and all players to expect everyone else to behave accordingly. Common knowledge means that every player has the same information, and they also know that everyone else knows that, and that everyone else knows that everyone else knows that, and so on, indefinitely. Common knowledge of rationality of all players is the reason why the winning guess is 0.

Economic game theorists have modelled this relationship between rationality and the common knowledge of rationality through K-level reasoning, where K stands for the number of times a cycle of reasoning is repeated. A Level-k model usually assumes that k-level 0 agents would approach the game naively and make choices distributed uniformly over the range [0, 100]. In accordance with cognitive hierarchy theory, level 1 players select the best responses to level 0 choices, while level 2 players select the best responses to level 1 choices. Level 1 players would assume that everyone else was playing at level 0, responding to an assumed average of 50 in relation to naive play, and thus their guess would be 33 (2/3 of 50). At k-level 2, a player would play more sophisticatedly and assume that all other players are playing at k-level 1, so they would choose 22 (2/3 of 33). Players are presumptively aware of the probability distributions of selections at each higher level. It would take approximately 21 k-levels to reach 0, the Nash equilibrium of the game.

The guessing game depends on three elements: the subject's perceptions of how the level 0 would play, the subject's expectations about the cognitive level of other players, and the number of in-game reasoning steps that the subject is capable of completing. Evidence suggests that most people play at k-levels 0 to 3, so one would have to think a step ahead to have a higher chance at winning the game. Therefore, being aware of this logic allows players to adjust their strategy. This means that perfectly rational players playing in such a game should not guess 0 unless they know that all other players are perfectly rational as well, and that all players' rationality is common knowledge. If a rational player reasonably believes that other players will not follow the chain of elimination described above, it would be rational for them to guess a number above 0 as their best response.

In reality, we can assume that most players are not perfectly rational, and do not have common knowledge of each other's rationality. As a result, they will also expect others to have a bounded rationality and thus guess a number higher than 0.

== Experimental results ==
This game is a common demonstration in game theory classes. It reveals the significant heterogeneity of behaviour. It is unlikely that many people will play rationally according to the Nash equilibrium, because the game has no strictly dominant strategy, so it requires players to consider what others will do. For Nash equilibrium to be played, players would need to assume both that everyone else is rational and that there is common knowledge of rationality.

Experiments demonstrate that many people make mistakes and do not assume common knowledge of rationality. It has been demonstrated that even economics graduate students do not guess 0. When performed among ordinary people it is usually found that the winner's guess is much higher than 0: the average value was found to be 33 in a large online competition organized by the Danish newspaper Politiken. 19,196 people participated and the prize was 5000 Danish kroner.

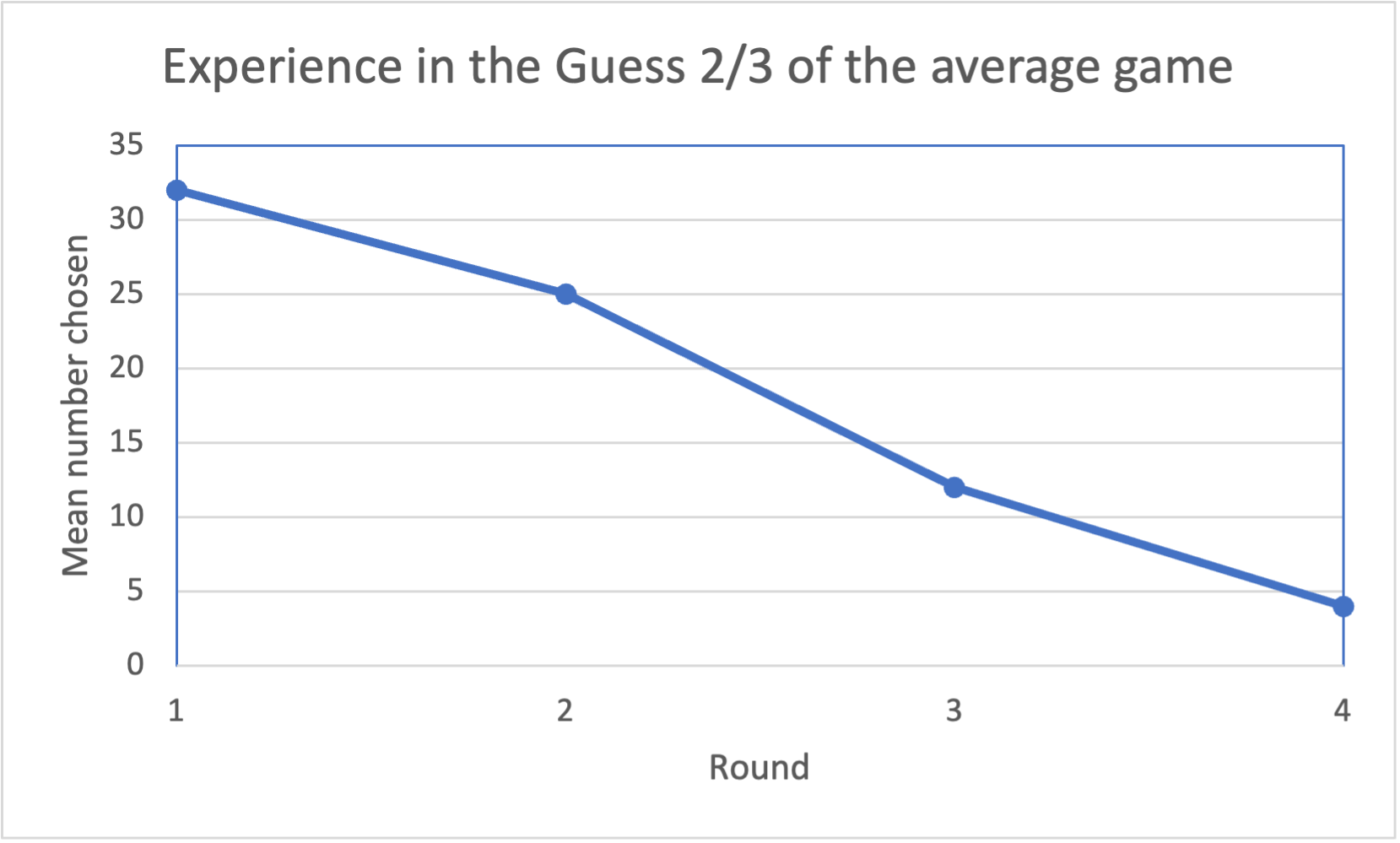
The mean number chosen when playing the "guess 2/3 of the average" game for four consecutive rounds

Grosskopf and Nagel's investigation also revealed that most players do not choose 0 the first time they play this game. Instead, they realise that 0 is the Nash equilibrium after certain amounts of repetitions. A study by Nagel reported an average initial choice of around 36. This corresponds to approximately two levels of k-level reasoning.

Kocher and Sutter compared the behaviours of individual decision-makers, and small groups making a decision, in playing this type of game. They observed that while they both applied roughly the same level of reasoning, small groups learned faster. This demonstrated that repetition enabled a small group to observe others' behaviour in previous games, and choose a number that increases their chances of winning the game.

Sbriglia's investigation also revealed that non-winners often try to imitate winners' understanding of the game's structure. Accordingly, other players adopt strategies which are best responses to the imitators' behaviour instead of to the average level of rationality. This accelerates the attainment of the game's Nash equilibrium.

== See also ==
- Keynesian beauty contest
- Unique bid auction
- Unexpected hanging paradox
