= Keynesian beauty contest =

Economics concept regarding equity markets

A Keynesian beauty contest is a metaphorical beauty contest in which judges are rewarded for selecting the most popular choices among all judges, rather than those they may personally find the most attractive. This idea is often applied in financial markets, whereby investors could profit more by buying whichever stocks they think other investors will buy, rather than the stocks that have fundamentally the best value, because when other people buy a stock, they bid up the price, allowing an earlier investor to cash out with a profit, regardless of whether the price increases are supported by its fundamentals and theoretical arguments.

The concept was developed by John Maynard Keynes and introduced in Chapter 12 of his work The General Theory of Employment, Interest and Money (1936) to explain price fluctuations in equity markets.

== Overview ==
Keynes described the action of rational agents in a market using an analogy based on a fictional newspaper contest, in which entrants are asked to choose the six most attractive faces from a hundred photographs. Those who picked the most popular faces are then eligible for a prize.

A naive strategy would be to choose the face that, in the opinion of the entrant, is the most handsome. A more sophisticated contest entrant, wishing to maximize the chances of winning a prize, would think about what the majority perception of attractiveness is, and then make a selection based on some inference from their knowledge of public perceptions. This can be carried one step further to take into account the fact that other entrants would each have their own opinion of what public perceptions are. Thus the strategy can be extended to the next order and the next and so on, at each level attempting to predict the eventual outcome of the process based on the reasoning of other rational agents.

"It is not a case of choosing those [faces] that, to the best of one's judgment, are really the prettiest, nor even those that average opinion genuinely thinks the prettiest. We have reached the third degree where we devote our intelligences to anticipating what average opinion expects the average opinion to be. And there are some, I believe, who practice the fourth, fifth and higher degrees." (Keynes, General Theory of Employment, Interest and Money, 1936).

Keynes believed that similar behavior was at work within the stock market. This would have investors pricing shares not based on what they think an asset's fundamental value is, or even on what investors think other investors believe about the asset's value, but on what they think other investors believe is the average opinion about the value of the asset, or even higher-order assessments.

== Example contests ==
In 2011, National Public Radio's Planet Money tested the theory by having its listeners select the cutest of three animal videos. The listeners were broken into two groups. One selected the animal they thought was cutest, and the other selected the one they thought most participants would think was the cutest. The results showed significant differences between the groups. Fifty percent of the first group selected a video with a kitten, compared to seventy-six percent of the second selecting the same kitten video. Individuals in the second group were generally able to disregard their own preferences and accurately make a decision based on the expected preferences of others. The results were considered to be consistent with Keynes' theory.

== See also ==
- Tactical voting
- Comparative advantage
- Focal point (game theory)
- Guess 2/3 of the average
- Family Feud
- Wisdom of the crowd
