= Spatial epidemiology =

Spatial epidemiology is a subfield of epidemiology focused on the study of the spatial distribution of health outcomes; it is closely related to health geography.

Specifically, spatial epidemiology is concerned with the description and examination of disease and its geographic variations. This is done in consideration of “demographic, environmental, behavioral, socioeconomic, genetic, and infections risk factors."

== Types of studies ==
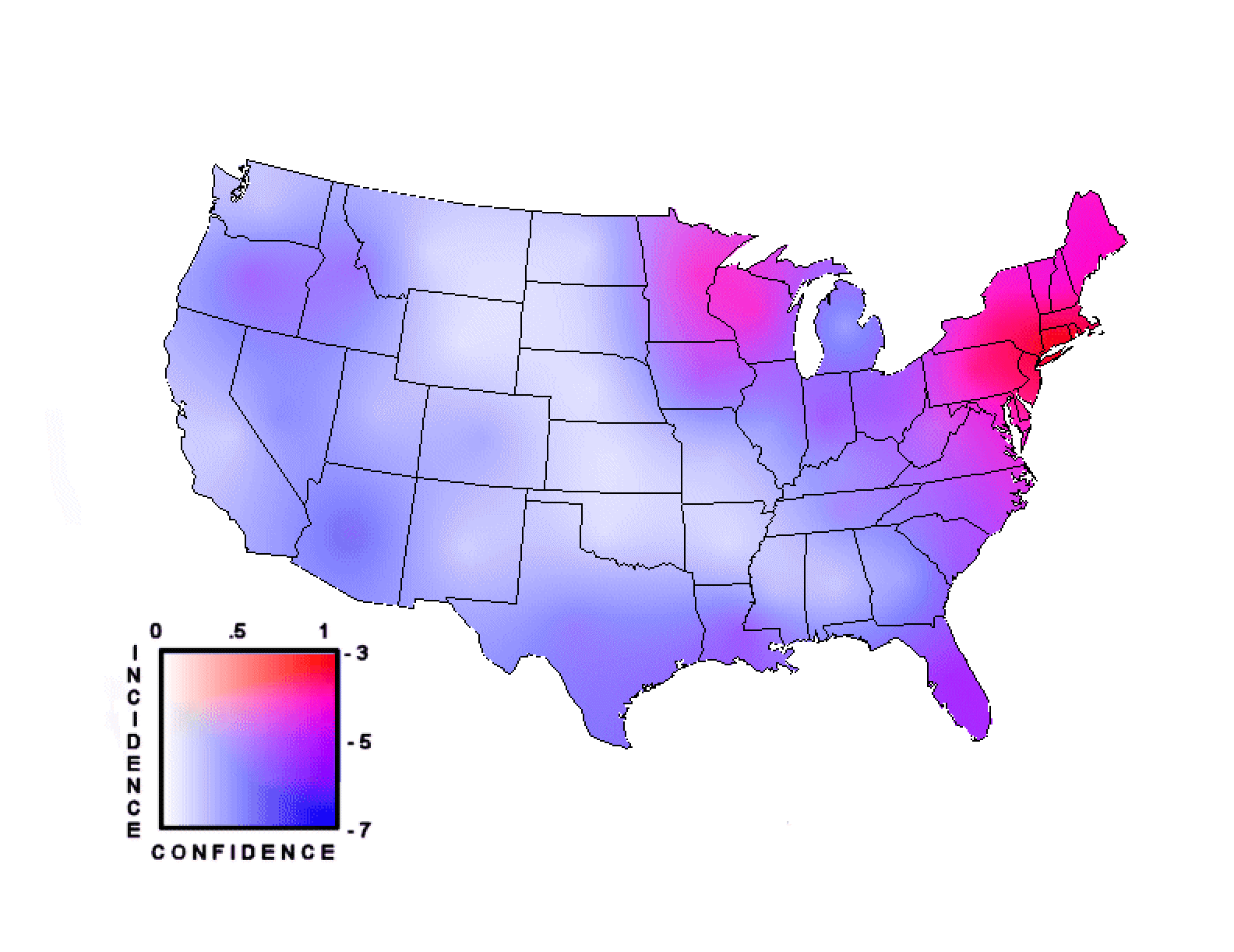
Lyme disease in the United States forecasted to 2010 with log(INCIDENCE) shown on a blue-red spectrum and CONFIDENCE on a saturation gradient.

Disease Mapping

- Disease maps are visual representations of intricate geographic data that provide a quick overview of said information. Mainly used for explanatory purposes, disease maps can be presented to survey high-risk areas and to help policy and resource allocation in said areas.

Geographic correlation studies

- Geographic correlation studies attempt to study the geographical factors and their effects on geographically differentiated health outcomes. Measured on an ecologic scale, these factors include environmental variables (quality of surrounding space), socioeconomic and demographic statistics (income and race), or even lifestyle choices (nutrition or diet) of the population groups under study. This approach has the convenience of being able to employ already available data from various surveying sources.

Clustering, disease clusters, and surveillance.

- Disease clusters, or spatial groupings of proximity and characteristically related epidemics. While the term itself is relatively poorly defined, it generally “implies an excess of cases above some background rate bounded in time and space.” Although clustering is not the most precise method for spatial analysis, it can and has proved useful for health-related surveillance and monitoring.

Because the statistical models used to draw up such research are complex, the data analysis and the interpretation of results should be carried out by qualified statisticians. Sometimes, the proliferation of errors in disease mapping has led to inefficient decision-making, implementation of inappropriate health policies and negative impact on the advancement of scientific knowledge.

== Challenges ==
Data availability and quality

- Since spatial epidemiology is almost entirely based on the analysis of data and its various visual representations, data collection methods must be routine, accurate, and publicly available. With the advent of specialized and accurate health equipment and global information networks, these methods can be relatively and easily improved. Compiling and standardizing data can also be done efficiently and usefully given the right tools and processes.

Data protection and confidentiality

- In our current time, legislation in the United States regarding individual human rights are gaining increasing support, especially in regards to the confidentiality of personal health data and consent over its use in medical investigations. Safe and secure data is a crucial aspect of successful epidemiologic research.

Exposure assessment and mapping

- Typically always seen as an analytical weakness, the quality of exposure data, or reported accuracy of the spatial reach of epidemics, is especially important in spatial epidemiology. With the more mainstream use of geographic information systems, the capabilities of spatial interpolation and mapping have been tremendously improved, yet these still greatly depend on the precision and legitimacy of the source data commissioned.

== See also ==
- Cluster (epidemiology)
- Complete spatial randomness
- Geographic information system
- Geographic information science
  - GIS and public health
- Modifiable areal unit problem
- Mutual standardisation
- Spatial analysis
- Spatial autocorrelation
- Time geography

Specific applications

- French paradox
- Stroke Belt
