= Overweight =

Above a weight considered healthy

- The overweight range according to the body mass index (BMI) is the area on the chart where BMI > 25.
- Specialty: Endocrinology

Being overweight is having more body fat than is considered healthy. The World Health Organization (WHO) classifies people as overweight when their body mass index (BMI)—a person's weight divided by the square of the person's height—is between 25–30 kg/m^{2}; BMIs above 30 kg/m^{2} are defined as obese. Being overweight is especially common where food supplies are plentiful and lifestyles are sedentary.

As of 2003, high BMIs reached high proportions globally, with more than 1 billion adults being considered overweight or obese. In 2013, this increased to more than 2 billion. Increases have been observed across all age groups.

A healthy body requires fat for proper functioning of the hormonal, reproductive, and immune systems, as thermal insulation, as shock absorption for sensitive areas, and as energy for future use; however, the accumulation of too much storage fat can impair movement and flexibility. Some people are naturally heavier and the body positivity movement has worked to reduce body shaming and improve self-confidence amongst heavierset people.

At a basic and fundamental level, the treatments called for are diet and exercise. More extensive treatment may involve support groups like Overeaters Anonymous and mental health treatment. The degree to which treatment is necessary varies culturally and with a medical assessment of an unhealthy weight, treatment has been facilitated by weight loss drugs like GLP-1 receptor agonists.

== Classification ==
Category	BMI (kg/m^{2})
Underweight	< 18.5
Normal weight	18.5–24.9
Overweight	25.0–29.9
Obese	≥ 30.0

The degree to which a person is overweight is generally described by the body mass index (BMI). Overweight is defined as a BMI of 25 or more, thus it includes pre-obesity defined as a BMI between 25 and 29.9 and obesity as defined by a BMI of 30 or more. Pre-obese and overweight however are often used interchangeably, thus giving overweight a common definition of a BMI of between 25 and 29.9. There are, however, several other common ways to measure the amount of adiposity or fat present in an individual's body.

- Body mass index

The body mass index (BMI) is a measure of a person's weight taking into account their height. It is given by the following formula: BMI equals a person's weight (mass) in kilograms divided by the square of the person's height in meters. The units therefore are kg/m^{2} but BMI measures are typically used and written without units.

BMI provides a significantly more accurate representation of body fat content than simply measuring a person's weight. It is only moderately correlated with both body fat percentage and body fat mass (R^{2} of 0.68). It does not take into account certain factors such as pregnancy or bodybuilding; however, the BMI is an accurate reflection of fat percentage in the majority of the adult population.

- Body volume index

The body volume index (BVI) was devised in 2000 as a computer, rather than manual, measurement of the human body for obesity and an alternative to the BMI

BVI uses 3D software to create an accurate image of a person so BVI can differentiate between people with the same BMI rating, but who have a different shape and different weight distribution.
BVI measures where a person's weight and the fat are located on the body, rather than total weight or total fat content and places emphasis on the weight carried around the abdomen, commonly known as central obesity. There has been an acceptance in recent years that abdominal fat and weight around the abdomen constitute a greater health risk.

- Simple weighing

A person's weight is measured and compared to an estimated ideal weight. This is the easiest and most common method, but by far the least accurate, as it only measures one quantity (weight) and often does not take into account many factors such as height, body type, and relative amount of muscle mass.

- Skinfold calipers or "pinch test"

The skin at several specific points on the body is pinched and the thickness of the resulting fold is measured. This measures the thickness of the layers of fat located under the skin, from which a general measurement of total amount of fat in the body is calculated. This method can be reasonably accurate for many people, but it assumes particular fat distribution patterns over the body—which may not apply to all individuals, and does not account for fat deposits not directly under the skin. Also, as the measurement and analysis generally involves a high degree of practice and interpretation, an accurate result requires that a professional perform it. It cannot generally be done by patients themselves.

- Bioelectrical impedance analysis

A small electric current is passed through the body to measure its electrical resistance. As fat and muscle conduct electricity differently, this method can provide a direct measurement of the body fat percentage, in relation to muscle mass. In the past, this technique could only be performed reliably by trained professionals with specialized equipment, but it is now possible to buy home testing kits that let people do this themselves with a minimum of training. Despite the improved simplicity of this process over the years, however, a number of factors can affect the results, including hydration and body temperature, so it still needs some care when taking the test to ensure that the results are accurate.

- Hydrostatic weighing

Considered one of the more accurate methods of measuring body fat, this technique involves complete submersion of a person in water, with special equipment to measure the person's weight while submerged. This weight is then compared with "dry weight" as recorded outside the water to determine overall body density. As fat is less dense than muscle, careful application of this technique can provide a reasonably close estimate of fat content in the body. This technique does, however, require expensive specialized equipment and trained professionals to administer it properly.

- Dual-energy X-ray absorptiometry (DEXA)

Originally developed to measure bone density, DEXA imaging is also used to precisely determine body fat content by using the density of various body tissues to identify which portions of the body are fat. This test is generally considered very accurate, but requires a great deal of expensive medical equipment and trained professionals to perform.

The most common method for discussing this subject and the one used primarily by researchers and advisory institutions is BMI. Definitions of what is considered overweight vary by ethnicity. The current definition proposed by the US National Institutes of Health (NIH) and the World Health Organization (WHO) designates whites, Hispanics and blacks with a BMI of 25 or more as overweight. For Asians, overweight is a BMI between 23 and 29.9 and obesity for all groups is a BMI of 30 or more.

BMI, however, does not account extremes of muscle mass, some rare genetic factors, the very young, and a few other individual variations. Thus it is possible for an individual with a BMI of less than 25 to have excess body fat, while others may have a BMI that is significantly higher without falling into this category. Some of the above methods for determining body fat are more accurate than BMI but are less convenient to measure.

If an individual is overweight and has excess body fat it can create or lead to health risks. Reports are surfacing, however, that being mildly overweight to slightly obese – BMI being between 24 and 31.9 – may be actually beneficial and that people with a BMI between 24 and 31.9 could actually live longer than normal weight or underweight persons.

== Health effects ==
While some negative health outcomes associated with obesity are accepted within the medical community, the health implications of the overweight category are more controversial.

A 2016 review estimated that the risk of death increases by seven percent among overweight people with a BMI of 25 to 27.5 and 20 percent among overweight people with a BMI of 27.5 to 30. Katherine Flegal et al., however, found that the mortality rate for individuals who are classified as overweight (BMI 25 to 29.9) may actually be lower than for those with an "ideal" weight (BMI 18.5 to 24.9), noting that many studies show that the lowest mortality rate is at a BMI close to 25. The specific conclusions appear to depend on what other factors are controlled for, and Flegal has accordingly alleged that the findings from the 2016 review are driven by bias toward preconceived opinions.

Being overweight directly increases the risk of type-II diabetes. Being overweight has been identified as a risk factor for cancer, and Walter Willett predicts that being overweight will overtake smoking as the primary cause of cancer in developed countries as cases of smoking-related cancer dwindle. Being overweight also increases the risk of oligospermia and azoospermia in men.

Psychological well-being is also at risk in the overweight individual due to social discrimination. Additionally it has been found that people who are overweight are at an increased risk for developing mental disorders such as panic disorder, depression and bipolar disorder while those who are already suffering from a mental illness are also more likely to become overweight themselves.

Being overweight has been shown not to increase mortality in older people: in a study of 70 to 75-year old Australians, mortality was lowest for "overweight" individuals (BMI 25 to 29.9), while a study of Koreans found that, among those initially aged 65 or more, an increase in BMI to above 25 was not associated with increased risk of death.

== Causes ==
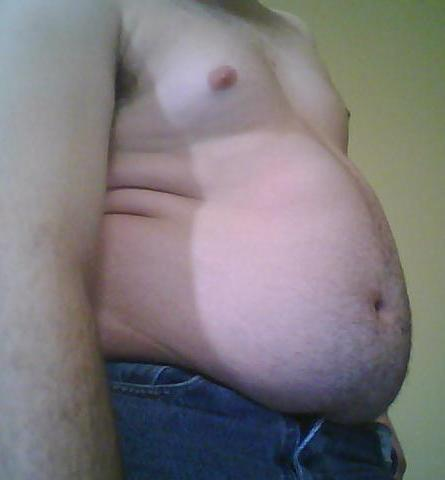
Belly of overweight teenage male

Being overweight is generally caused by the intake of more calories (by eating) than are expended by the body (by exercise and everyday activity). Factors that may contribute to this imbalance include:

- Alcoholism
- Eating disorders (such as binge eating)
- Genetic predisposition
- Hormonal imbalances (e.g. hypothyroidism)
- Insufficient or poor-quality sleep
- Limited physical exercise and a sedentary lifestyle
- Poor nutrition
- Metabolic disorders, which could be caused by repeated attempts to lose weight by weight cycling
- Overeating
- Psychotropic medication (e.g. olanzapine)
- Smoking cessation and other stimulant withdrawal
- Stress

People who have insulin dependent diabetes and chronically overdose insulin may gain weight, while people who already are overweight may develop insulin tolerance, and in the long run develop type II diabetes.

== Treatment ==
The usual treatments for overweight individuals is diet and physical exercise.

Dietitians generally recommend eating several balanced meals dispersed through the day, with a combination of progressive, primarily aerobic, physical exercise. In fact, some research found benefits from physical activity, diet and behaviour changes on BMI in children from 12 to 17 years old.

Considering that most of the treatment strategies are directed to change lifestyle-related behaviours of individuals (namely in dietary and physical activity), the transtheoretical model (TTM) has been used as a framework to design weight management interventions. A systematic review assessed the effectiveness of dietary and physical activity interventions based on the TTM in producing sustainable (one year or longer) weight loss in overweight and obese adults. The included studies did not allow to produce conclusive evidence about the impact of the use of this model combined with these interventions on sustainable weight loss. Nevertheless, very low quality scientific evidence suggests that this approach may lead to improvements in physical activity and dietary habits, namely increased in both exercise duration and frequency, and fruits and vegetables consumption, along with reduced dietary fat intake.

== Epidemiology ==
Share of men defined as overweight

The World Health Organization (WHO) estimated that nearly 2 billion adults worldwide, aged 18 years and older, were overweight in 2016.

According to the National Health and Nutrition Examination Survey (NHANES), an estimated 71.6% of the United States' adult population aged 20 and over is considered either overweight or obese, and this percentage has increased over the last four decades.

According to the World Obesity Federation's 2023 atlas, it predicts that 51% of the world will be overweight or obese by 2035. The report also found that most countries expecting to see a large increase in obesity are predominantly low or middle-income countries.

== See also ==
- Body image
- Underweight
- Fat acceptance movement
- Physical attractiveness
- Big Beautiful Woman (BBW)
