= Essential fatty acid interactions =

Chemical interactions

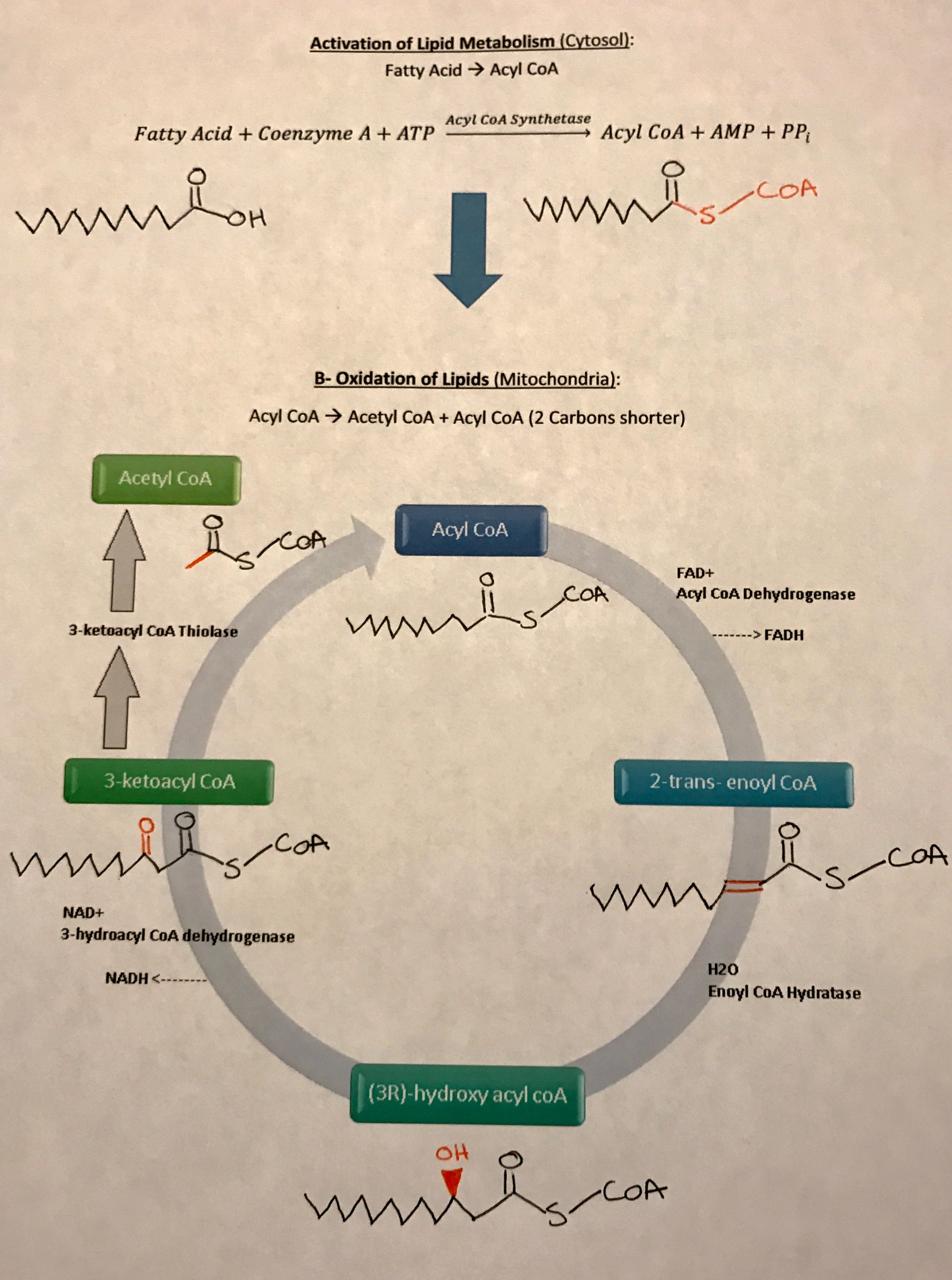
Fatty acid breakdown

There is a wide variety of fatty acids found in nature. Two classes of fatty acids are considered essential, the omega-3 and omega-6 fatty acids. Essential fatty acids are necessary for humans, but cannot be synthesized by the body and must therefore, be obtained from food. Omega-3 and omega-6 are used in some cellular signaling pathways and are involved in mediating inflammation, protein synthesis, and metabolic pathways in the human body.

Arachidonic acid (AA) is a 20-carbon omega-6 essential fatty acid. It sits at the head of the "arachidonic acid cascade," which initiates 20 different signalling pathways that control a wide array of biological functions, including inflammation, cell growth, and the central nervous system. Most AA in the human body is derived from dietary linoleic acid (18:2 ω-6), which is found in nuts, seeds, vegetable oils, and animal fats.

== Eicosanoid series nomenclature ==
Eicosanoids are signaling molecules derived from the essential fatty acids (EFAs). They are a major pathway by which the EFAs act in the body. There are four classes of eicosanoid and two or three series within each class. The plasma membranes of cells contain phospholipids, composed of a hydrophilic phosphate head and two hydrophobic fatty acid tails. Some of these fatty acids are 20-carbon polyunsaturated essential fatty acids (AA, EPA, or DGLA). EFAs are cleaved out of the phospholipid and released as free fatty acids. The EFA is oxygenated (by either of two pathways) and further modified, yielding the eicosanoids.

After oxidation, the eicosanoids are further modified, making a series. Members of a series are differentiated by a letter and are numbered by the number of double bonds, which does not change within a series. For example, cyclooxygenase action upon AA (with 4 double bonds) leads to the series-2 thromboxanes (TXA_{2}, TXB_{2}... ), each with two double bonds. Cyclooxygenase action on EPA (with 5 double bonds) leads to the series-3 thromboxanes (TXA_{3}, TXB_{3}, etc.), each with three double bonds. There are exceptions to this pattern, some of which indicate stereochemistry (PGF_{2α}).

Table (1) shows these sequences for AA (20:4 ω-6). The sequences for EPA (20:5 ω-3) and DGLA (20:3 ω-6) are analogous.

Table 1 Three 20-carbon EFAs and the eicosanoid series derived from them
Dietary Essential Fatty Acid	Abbreviation	Formula carbons: double bonds ω	Eicosanoid product series		
Dietary Essential Fatty Acid	Abbreviation	Formula carbons: double bonds ω	TX PG PGI	LK	Effects
Gamma-linolenic acid via Dihomo gamma linolenic acid	GLA; DGLA	18:3ω6 20:3ω6	series-1	series-3	less inflammatory
Arachidonic acid	AA	20:4ω6	series-2	series-4	more inflammatory
Eicosapentaenoic acid	EPA	20:5ω3	series-3	series-5	less inflammatory

All prostanoids are substituted prostanoic acids. Cyberlipid Center's Prostenoid page illustrates the parent compound and the rings associated with each series letter.

The IUPAC and the IUBMB use the equivalent term icosanoid.

== The arachidonic acid cascade in the Central Nervous System ==
The arachidonic acid cascade is arguably the most elaborate signaling system neurobiologists have to deal with.

— Daniele Piomelli Arachidonic Acid

The arachidonic acid cascade proceeds somewhat differently in the central nervous system (CNS). Neurohormones, neuromodulators, or neurotransmitters act as first messengers. They activate phospholipids to release AA from neuron cell membranes as a free fatty acid. During its short lifespan, free AA may affect the activity of the neuron's ion channels and protein kinases. Or it may be metabolized to form eicosanoids, epoxyeicosatrienoic acids (EETs), neuroprotectin D, or various endocannabinoids (anandamide and its analogs).

The actions of eicosanoids within the brain are not as well characterized as they are in inflammation. Studies suggest that they act as second messengers within the neuron, possibly controlling presynaptic inhibition and the activation of protein kinase C. They also act as paracrine mediators, acting across synapses to nearby cells. The effects of these signals are not well understood. Daniele Piomelli has commented:

Neurons in the CNS are organized as interconnected groups of functionally related cells (e.g. in sensory systems). A diffusible factor released from a neuron into the interstitial fluid, and able to interact with membrane receptors on adjacent cells would be ideally used to "synchronize" the activity of an ensemble of interconnected neural cells. Furthermore, during development and in certain forms of learning, postsynaptic cells may secrete regulatory factors that diffuse back to the presynaptic component, determining its survival as an active terminal, the amplitude of its sprouting, and its efficacy in secreting neurotransmitters—a phenomenon known as retrograde regulation. Studies have proposed that arachidonic acid metabolites participate in retrograde signaling and other forms of local modulation of neuronal activity.

Table 2.The arachidonic acid cascades act differently between the inflammatory response and the brain.
Arachidonic Acid Cascade
	In inflammation	In the brain
Major effect on	Inflammation in tissue	Neuronal excitability
AA released from	White blood cells	Neurons
Triggers for AA release	Inflammatory stimuli	Neurotransmitters, neurohormones and neuromodulators
Intracellular effects on	DNA transcription of cytokines and other mediators of inflammation	Activity of ion channels and protein kinases
Metabolized to form	Eicosanoids, resolvins, isofurans, isoprostanes, lipoxins, epoxyeicosatrienoic acids (EETs)	Eicosanoids, neuroprotectin D, EETs and some endocannabinoids

== Further discussion ==
Figure 2 shows two pathways from EPA to DHA, including the exceptional Sprecher's shunt.

5-LO acts at the fifth carbon from the carboxyl group. Other lipoxygenases—8-LO, 12-LO, and 15-LO—make other eicosanoid-like products. To act, 5-LO uses the nuclear-membrane enzyme 5-lipoxygenase-activating protein (FLAP), first to a hydroperoxyeicosatetraenoic acid (HPETE), then to the first leukotriene, LTA.

== See also ==
- Docosanoid
- Eicosanoid
- Essential fatty acid
- Fatty acid ratio in food
