= Obesity paradox =

Medical hypothesis

The obesity paradox is the finding in some studies of a lower mortality rate for overweight or obese people within certain subpopulations. The paradox has been observed in people with cardiovascular disease and cancer. Explanations for the paradox range from excess weight being protective to the statistical association being caused by methodological flaws such as confounding, detection bias, reverse causality, or selection bias.

== Description ==
The terminology "reverse epidemiology" was first proposed by Kamyar Kalantar-Zadeh in the journal Kidney International in 2003 and in the Journal of the American College of Cardiology in 2004. It is a contradiction to prevailing medical concepts of prevention of atherosclerosis and cardiovascular disease; however, active prophylactic treatment of heart disease in otherwise healthy, asymptomatic people has been and is controversial in the medical community for several years.

The mechanism responsible for this reversed association is unknown, but it has been theorized that, in chronic kidney disease patients, "The common occurrence of persistent inflammation and protein energy wasting in advanced CKD [chronic kidney disease] seems to a large extent to account for this paradoxical association between traditional risk factors and CV [cardiovascular] outcomes in this patient population." Other research has proposed that the paradox also may be explained by adipose tissue storing lipophilic chemicals that would otherwise be toxic to the body.

The obesity paradox (excluding the cholesterol paradox) was first described in 1999 in overweight and obese people undergoing hemodialysis, and has subsequently been found in those with heart failure, myocardial infarction, acute coronary syndrome, chronic obstructive pulmonary disease (COPD), pulmonary embolisms, and in older nursing home residents.

While obese people have twice the risk of developing heart failure compared to individuals with a normal BMI, once a person experiences heart failure, those with a BMI between 30.0 and 34.9 had lower mortality than those with a normal BMI. This observation fits into the broader concept of Cuomo's paradox, in which a factor associated with disease occurrence bears the opposite association with mortality among individuals with the disease. The obesity paradox has been attributed to the fact that people often lose weight when they have severe and chronic illness (a syndrome called cachexia). Similar findings have been made in other types of heart disease. Among people with heart disease, those with class I obesity do not have greater rates of further heart problems than people of normal weight. In people with greater degrees of obesity, however, risk of further events is increased. Even after cardiac bypass surgery, no increase in mortality is seen in the overweight and obese. One study found that the improved survival could be explained by the more aggressive treatment obese people receive after a cardiac event. Another found that if one takes into account COPD in those with peripheral artery disease, the benefit of obesity no longer exists.

The obesity paradox is also relevant in discussion of weight loss as a preventative health measure – weight-cycling (a repeated pattern of losing and then regaining weight) is more common in obese people, and has health effects commonly assumed to be caused by obesity, such as hypertension, insulin resistance, and cardiovascular diseases.

== Criticisms ==
=== Methodology ===
The obesity paradox has been criticized on the grounds of being an artifact arising from biases in observational studies. Strong confounding by smoking has been noted by several researchers, although others have suggested that smoking does not account for the observed patterns. Since smokers, who are subject to higher mortality rates, also tend to be leaner, inadequate adjustment for smoking would lead to underestimations of the risk ratios associated with the overweight and obese categories of BMI among non-smokers. In an analysis of 1.46 million individuals, restriction to never-smoking participants greatly reduced the mortality estimates in the underweight group, as well as strengthening the estimates in the overweight and obese groups. This study concluded that, for non-Hispanic white adults who have never smoked, the BMI range of 20.0 to 24.9 was associated with the lowest mortality rates. A similar 2016 study found that, of the BMI ranges studied (which ranged from 18.5 to >30), the "normal" 18.5–22.4 BMI range combined with healthy eating, high levels of physical activity, not smoking, and no more than moderate alcohol consumption was associated with the lowest risk of premature death.

Another concern is reverse causation due to illness-induced weight loss. That is, it may not be low BMI that is causing death (and thereby making obesity seem protective) but rather imminent death causing low BMI. Indeed, unintentional weight loss is an extremely significant predictor of mortality. Terminally ill individuals often undergo weight loss before death, and classifying those individuals as lean greatly inflates the mortality rate in the normal and underweight categories of BMI, while lowering the risk in the higher BMI categories. Studies that employ strategies to reduce reverse causation such as excluding sick individuals at baseline and introducing time lag to exclude deaths at the beginning of follow-up have yielded estimates of increased risk for body mass indices above 25 kg/m^{2}.

The obesity paradox may therefore result from people becoming lean due to smoking, sedentary lifestyles, and unhealthy diets – all factors which also negatively impact health.

Critics of the paradox have also argued that studies supporting its existence almost always use BMI as the only measure of obesity. However, because BMI is an imperfect method of measuring obesity, critics argue that studies using other measures of obesity in addition to BMI, such as waist circumference and waist to hip ratio, render the existence of the paradox questionable.

One probable methodological explanation for the obesity paradox in regards to cardiovascular disease is collider stratification bias, which commonly emerges when one restricts or stratifies on a factor (the "collider") that is caused by both the exposure (or its descendants) of an unmeasured variable and the outcome (or its ancestors or risk factors). In the example of the obesity-cardiovascular disease relationship, the obesity is the collider, the outcome is cardiovascular disease, and the unmeasured variables are environmental and genetic factors – given that obesity and cardiovascular disorders are often associated with each other, medical professionals may be reluctant to consider both other causes of cardiovascular disease or other causes of protection against said diseases.

A study from 2018 found that overweight or obese patients may live longer with cardiovascular disease than people of normal weight due to overweight/obese patients having earlier onset of cardiovascular disease in the life course, suggesting an explanation for the observation. This paper suggests a driver of the paradoxical observation, in that the reason for higher survival rates in the sick may be that normal weight individuals may largely avoid cardiovascular conditions.

=== Ties to Coca-Cola ===
It has also been noted that Coca-Cola has promoted the hypothesis and funded researchers who agree with the hypothesis, which has raised questions about what research the company supports and why.

=== Weight relativism ===
Dixon et al. have proposed that a paradox does not actually exist, as people can be healthy at a range of sizes. As one study puts it, "There is no 'obesity paradox' to explain, if we accept the premise that varying ideal weight ranges apply to individuals over different stages of the life span, accordingly allowing us to abandon the rigid biologically implausible concept of a single 'ideal weight' (for height) or weight range."

== See also ==
- French paradox
- Israeli paradox
- Low birth-weight paradox (Low birth-weight babies born to smokers have a lower mortality than low birth-weight babies born to non-smokers, because other causes of low birth-weight are more harmful than smoking.)
- Katherine Flegal
- Social stigma of obesity
