= Israeli paradox =

Paradox of high CHD incidence among Israeli Jews

The Israeli paradox was an apparently paradoxical epidemiological observation that Israeli Jews have a relatively high incidence of coronary heart disease (CHD), despite having a diet relatively low in saturated fats, in apparent contradiction to the widely held belief that the high consumption of such fats is a risk factor for CHD. The paradox was that if the thesis linking saturated fats to CHD is valid, the Israelis ought to have a lower rate of CHD than comparable countries where the per capita consumption of such fats is higher.

Since 1996, when observations were published, CHD rates in Israel (which were even at the time lower than USA or France) have significantly fallen. In 2020, and since, Israel has one of the lowest age-standardized mortality rates attributable to cardiovascular causes.

The observation of Israel's paradoxically high rate of CHD although outdated is still used by some seed oil critics along with other disputed paradoxes. The most famous of these paradoxes is known as the "French paradox": France enjoys a relatively low incidence of CHD despite a high per-capita consumption of saturated fat.

The Israeli paradox implied two possibilities which are now largely disproven. The first is that the hypothesis linking saturated fats to CHD is not completely valid. The second possibility is that the link between saturated fats and CHD is valid, but that some additional factor in the typical Israeli diet, lifestyle or genes creates another CHD risk—presumably with the implication that if this factor can be identified, it can be isolated in the diet or lifestyle of other countries, thereby allowing both the Israelis, and others, to avoid that particular risk.

== Quantifying the paradox ==
Israeli Jews eat a diet which is richer in linoleic acid (the most readily available plant-based form of omega-6 fatty acid, found in many vegetable oils) than any other population on the planet. Average per capita consumption is approximately 30 grams a day (11 kilograms annually), compared to 25 grams daily for the average American in 1985.

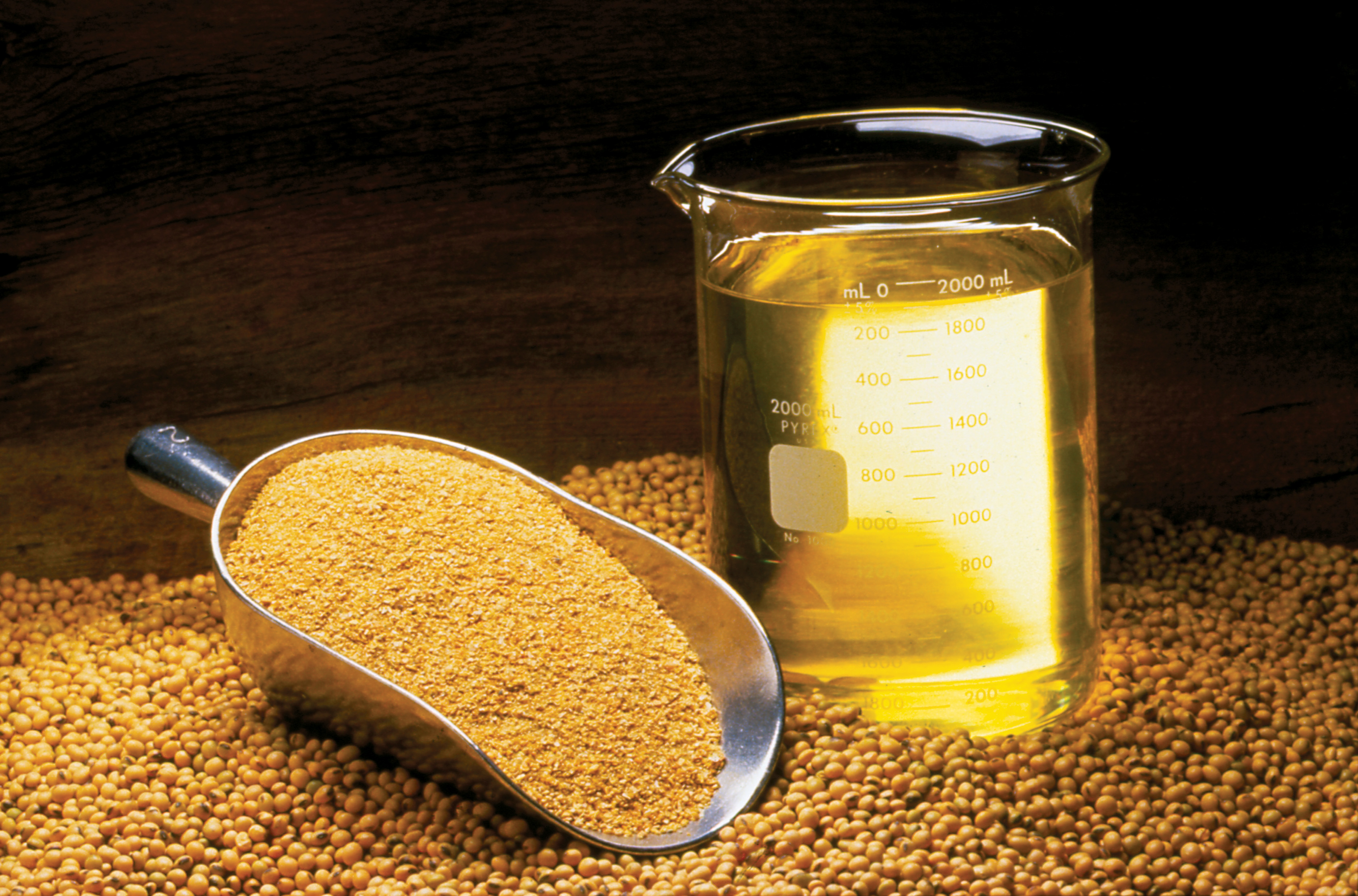
Soybean, soybean meal and soybean oil

Susan Allport summarizes the Israeli paradox in the following words:

Israelis eat less animal fat and cholesterol and fewer calories than Americans, but they have comparable rates of heart disease, obesity, diabetes and many cancers. They have an ideal diet, as far as the American food pyramid is concerned, but far from ideal health.”

Allport notes that “Little butter is consumed in Israel, but large quantities of soybean, corn and safflower oil are…. This translates, researchers estimate, to a linoleic acid intake of about 11 percent of calories and a ratio of linoleic to alpha linolenic acid [the most readily-available plant-based omega-3 fatty acid] in the Israeli diet of about 26:1.” She observes that mean serum cholesterol in Israel is quite low by the standards of developed countries: 210 milligrams/dl. Therefore, one distinction that can, without controversy, be attributed to the high levels of linoleic acid in the Israeli diet is the high percentage of linoleic acid in the adipose tissue of Israelis: 24% as compared to 16% in Americans and less than 10% in many northern Europeans.

In 1993, a 23-year follow-up study to the Israeli Ischemic Heart Disease Study of ten thousand public service employees (widely referred to as the “Israeli Civil Service Study”) found that there were only “weak associations of long-term coronary mortality with the dietary intake patterns of fatty acids.”

== Identifying and naming the paradox ==
Comparison of dietary fat composition

The term "Israeli Paradox" was first used by researchers Daniel Yam, Abraham Eliraz and Elliot Berry in a 1996 article in the Israel Journal of Medical Sciences. The authors observed that Israelis consumed polyunsaturated fatty acids (primarily omega-6s rather than omega-3s) at a rate about 8% higher than in the United States and about 10–12% higher than most of Europe. They wrote, “Israeli Jews may be regarded as a population-based dietary experiment of the effect of a high omega-6 PUFA [polyunsaturated fatty acid] diet.”

The most readily-observable result of the relatively high ratio of omega-6 fats to saturated fats in the Israeli diet was the deposition of omega-6 fats in preference to saturated fats in the adipose tissue of Israelis. This had been observed as early as 1976, when an article in the Israel Journal of Medical Sciences noted that, counting polyunsaturated fats (which includes both omega-6 and omega-3 fatty acids) as a whole, the ratio of polyunsaturated fats to saturated fats in the adipose tissue of Ashkenazi Jews in Israel was 0.88:1, while for non-Ashkenazi Jews it was 1.13:1. This was, according to the authors, “the highest reported for any population on a free-choice diet.”

== See also ==
- Fatty acid ratio in food
- French paradox
- Israeli cuisine
- List of paradoxes
- Mexican paradox
- Saturated fat and cardiovascular disease
- Stroke Belt
