= Walter Willett =

American nutritionist

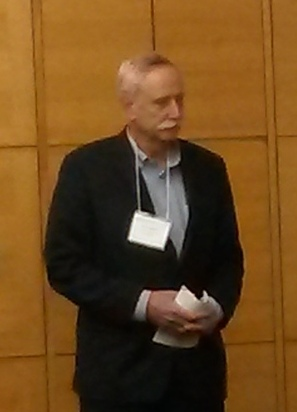
- Willett at the Agriculture, Nutrition, Health, and the Environment in Africa conference in LMA, the 9th Annual Nutrition and Global Health Symposium, 2017
- Born: June 20, 1945 (age 81); Hart, Michigan, United States
- Education: Michigan State University (BS); University of Michigan Medical School (MD); Harvard University (MPH); Harvard School of Public Health 1980 (Dr.PH)
- Known for: Nurses' Health Study II (PI); Health Professionals Follow-up Study (PI); Nutritional Epidemiology textbook; EAT-Lancet Commission, co-chair
- Spouse: Gail Pettiford Willett
- Children: 2
- Scientific career
- Fields: nutrition, epidemiology, medicine, public health research
- Workplaces: Harvard Medical School; Harvard School of Public Health

Walter C. Willett (born June 20, 1945) is an American physician and nutrition researcher. He is the Fredrick John Stare Professor of Epidemiology and Nutrition at the Harvard School of Public Health and was the chair of its department of nutrition from 1991 to 2017. He is also a professor of medicine at Harvard Medical School.

Willett is the principal investigator of the second Nurses' Health Study (NHS2 or NHS II), a compilation of studies regarding the health of older women and their risk factors for major chronic diseases. He has published more than 2,000 scientific articles regarding various aspects of diet and disease and is the second most cited author in clinical medicine.

Willett is perhaps best known for his 2001 book Eat, Drink, and Be Healthy and the ensuing controversy over it. The book presents nutritional information and recommendations based on what was then the consensus of nutrition scientists, and is critical of many misconceptions about diet and nutrition, including ideas presented by guidelines from American organizations such as the USDA. Willett is frequently quoted by the media in articles regarding nutrition.

== Early life and education ==
Willett was born on June 20, 1945, in Hart, Michigan. He attended Michigan State University where he studied physics and food science, and was admitted to the University of Michigan Medical School in 1966.He received his M.D. in 1970, summa cum laude.

After completing his medical degree, Willett undertook postdoctoral training in internal medicine at Boston City Hospital (intern, 1970–71; fellow in family and ambulatory medicine, 1971–73; resident, 1973–74). He earned an M.P.H. from the Harvard School of Public Health in 1973 and a Dr.P.H. in Epidemiology from the same institution in 1980.

From 1977 to 1980 he was a Research Fellow in Medicine at Harvard Medical School, and concurrently a Research Fellow at Peter Bent Brigham Hospital (1979–80).

== Career ==
=== University of Dar es Salaam (1974–1977) ===
Following his residency at Boston City Hospital, Willett took up a position at the University of Dar es Salaam's Faculty of Medicine in Tanzania. He served as Lecturer in Medicine from 1974 to 1975, and from 1975 to 1977 as Lecturer in Community Medicine and Head of the Community Health Department. Work from this period included a randomized trial examining the relationship between ascaris infection and child growth rates, published in the American Journal of Public Health in 1979.

=== Harvard School of Public Health (1980–present) ===
Willett joined the Harvard School of Public Health (now Harvard T.H. Chan School of Public Health) as Assistant Professor of Epidemiology in 1980, was promoted to Associate Professor in 1984, and to Professor of Epidemiology and Nutrition in 1987 and has held this position continuously.

From 1991 to 2016 he served as Chairman of the Department of Nutrition and the Fredrick John Stare Professorship of Epidemiology and Nutrition. He was also appointed Lecturer in Medicine at Harvard Medical School from 1986 to 1992, and Professor of Medicine from 1992 to 2021.

From 2010 to 2016, Willett held a Foreign Adjunct Professorship in Nutritional Epidemiology at the Karolinska Institute of Environmental Medicine in Stockholm.

He held hospital appointments at Boston City Hospital (1977–84) and Brigham and Women's Hospital, where he was Associate Physician from 1982 to 2021.

=== EAT-Lancet Commission (2017–2025) ===
Willett served as co-chair of the EAT-Lancet Commission on Food, Planet, Health from 2017 to 2025. The Commission brought together scientists in nutrition, sustainability, and food systems to develop scientifically grounded targets for healthy diets from sustainable food systems. Its 2019 report, Food in the Anthropocene, set global benchmarks for healthy and environmentally sustainable diets and was published simultaneously with a flagship article in The Lancet. An update Commission report was published in 2025.

== Research ==
=== Prospective cohort studies ===
The principal vehicle for Willett's research has been a set of large, long-running prospective observational cohorts. He was a co-investigator on the Nurses' Health Study I (NHS I), the original cohort established in 1976, which enrolled more than 121,000 nurses and has followed them for five decades. He is principal investigator of Nurses' Health Study II (NHS II), which enrolled more than 116,000 younger female nurses beginning in 1989 and examines diet, lifestyle, and the risk of chronic disease. He is also the principal investigator of the Health Professionals Follow-up Study (HPFS), a cohort of more than 51,000 male health professionals enrolled in 1986. In both studies, participants complete detailed dietary questionnaires every two to four years, allowing analysis of diet as it changes over time.

=== Dietary assessment methodology ===
A substantial part of Willett's methodological contributions concerns the measurement and analysis of dietary intake in large epidemiological studies. His group developed and validated the semiquantitative food frequency questionnaire (FFQ) as a practical tool for capturing habitual diet in large cohorts. A foundational paper on the reproducibility and validity of the FFQ was published in the American Journal of Epidemiology in 1985. The textbook Nutritional Epidemiology (Oxford University Press, 1990; 2nd ed. 1998; 3rd ed. 2013) documents these methodological approaches and is widely used in graduate instruction.

=== Diet, cancer, and cardiovascular disease ===
Willett's research group has produced a large body of work examining associations between specific dietary patterns, nutrients, and foods and the risk of cancer (particularly breast and colorectal cancer), cardiovascular disease, type 2 diabetes, and other chronic conditions. Early papers from the Nurses' Health Study examined the relationships between dietary fat, red meat intake, and colorectal cancer risk. Later work has investigated the role of specific fatty acids, refined carbohydrates, glycaemic index, whole grains, and plant-based dietary patterns in risk of chronic disease. His research on industrial trans fatty acids provided key evidence that ultimately led to their elimination in the United States and many other countries.

=== Obesity and body weight ===
Willett and colleagues have published extensively on biases in studies of body weight and mortality. He has been a prominent critic of research associated with the so-called "obesity paradox," the hypothesis that overweight or mild obesity reduces mortality. He described work on this topic by Katherine Flegal and colleagues at the Centers for Disease Control and Prevention's National Center for Health Statistics as a "pile of rubbish". In 2013 the journal Nature published an editorial rebuking Willett for the manner of his criticism, noting that it misrepresented the complexity of the evidence and employed inappropriate language.

In 2021, Flegal published an article in Progress in Cardiovascular Diseases describing what she characterized as a sustained campaign by Willett and associates to undermine and discredit her research, including "insults, errors, misinformation, social media posts, behind-the-scenes gossip and maneuvers, and complaints to her employer". Flegal also questioned Willett's statistical qualifications to criticize her team's work on mortality estimation. Notably, multiple committees have reviewed the evidence on body weight and the Centers for Disease Control and the National Institutes of Health have not changed weight guidelines because of the “obesity paradox” hypothesis. The clinical definition of obesity remains a subject of debate, though the discussion has centered on whether to broaden the definition rather than to narrow it as the “obesity paradox” would imply.

=== Dietary guidelines and public communication ===
Willett has been critic of official dietary guidelines, in particular those issued by the United States Department of Agriculture, which until recently have promoted reduction in all types of fat and high intakes of carbohydrates. His 2001 book Eat, Drink, and Be Healthy presented an alternative "Healthy Eating Pyramid" grounded in epidemiological evidence, arguing that the USDA food pyramid gave insufficient weight to the distinction between saturated and unsaturated fats and between refined and whole-grain carbohydrates.

Willett has been frequently cited by news media on nutrition topics. He has worked with the Culinary Institute of America and Harvard University dining services to align the university's food offerings with current nutritional evidence.

== Influence on Harvard meal plans and cafeterias ==
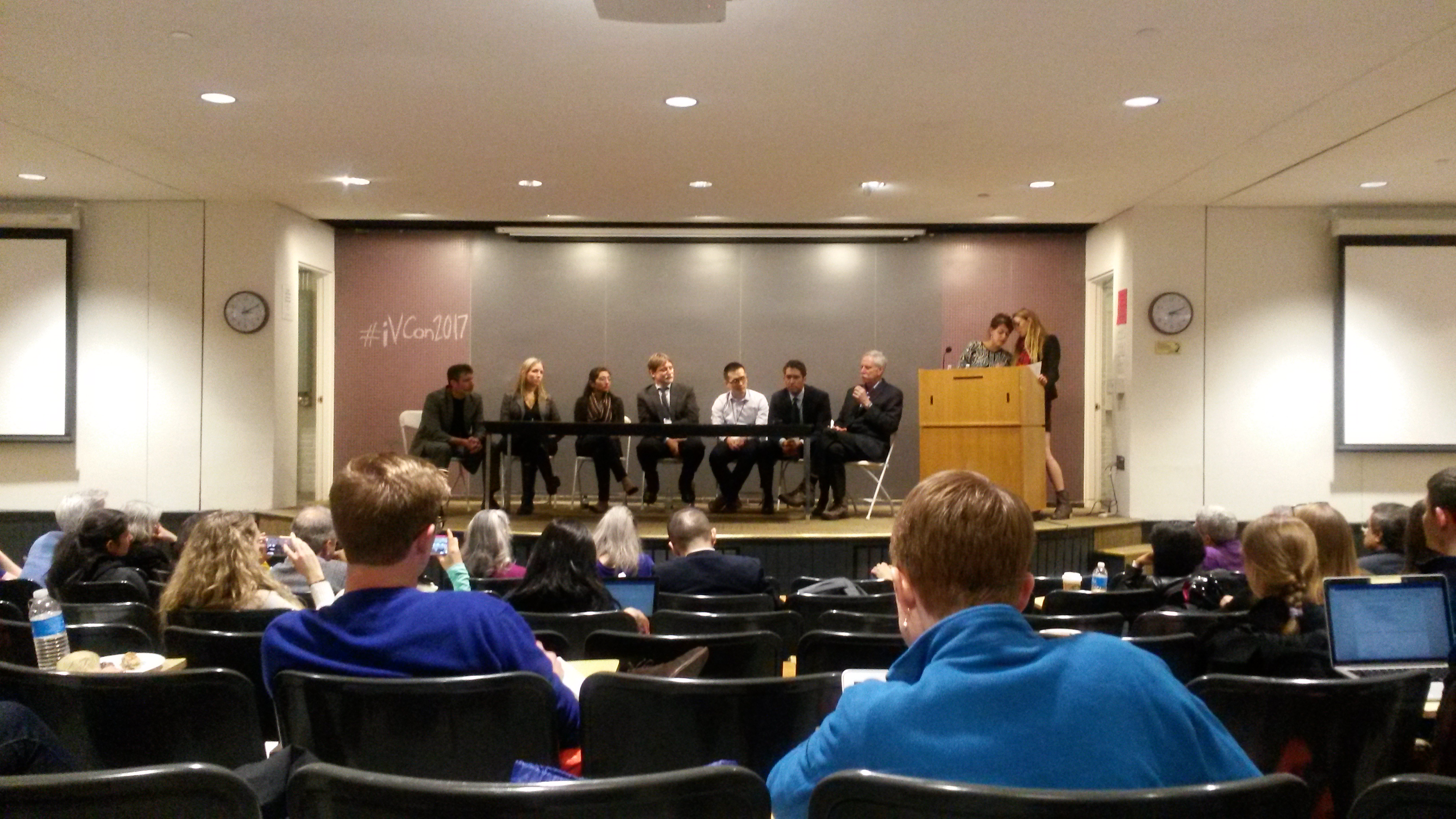
Willett (right with microphone) on panel on vegan nutrition at Harvard, 2017

Willett has been actively involved in helping Harvard University food services to update their offerings along current nutritional guidelines. While his work has influenced the menu choices, students and Willett have noted that the menus still have a long way to go to reflect the currently available nutrition science.

== Dispute with Katherine Flegal ==
Willett has been a high-profile critic of research into the obesity paradox posited by, among others, American epidemiologist Katherine Flegal and her colleagues at the Centers for Disease Control and Prevention's National Center for Health Statistics, going so far as to call it a "pile of rubbish ... No one should waste their time reading it." In 2013, the journal Nature ran an editorial rebuking Willett for the style and manner of his criticism, saying it misrepresented the complexity of the science involved and used inappropriate language in doing so.

In 2021, Flegal published an article in the journal Progress in Cardiovascular Diseases accusing Willett and some of his Harvard School of Public Health colleagues of being part of "an aggressive campaign that included insults, errors, misinformation, social media posts, behind-the-scenes gossip and maneuvers, and complaints to her employer." Flegal wrote that the goal Willett and his allies "appeared to be to undermine and discredit her work," and that, "The controversy was something deliberately manufactured, and the attacks primarily consisted of repeated assertions of preconceived opinions." Flegal also questioned Willett's competence to criticize her team's statistical research, as he "was not a statistician and had no expertise in estimating the number of deaths associated with obesity."

== Books ==
Books authored or co-authored by Willett:

- Nutritional Epidemiology. Oxford University Press, 1990. [1st edition]
- Nutritional Epidemiology, 2nd edition. Oxford University Press, 1998. ISBN 0-19-512297-6.
- Nutritional Epidemiology, 3rd edition. Oxford University Press, 2013.
- Eat, Drink, and Be Healthy: The Harvard Medical School Guide to Healthy Eating. Simon and Schuster, 2001. [1st edition]
- Eat, Drink, and Be Healthy, 2nd edition. Simon and Schuster, 2005. ISBN 0-684-86337-5.
- Eat, Drink, and Weigh Less (with Mollie Katzen). Hyperion, 2006. ISBN 1-4013-0892-9.
- The Fertility Diet (with Jorge Chavarro and Patrick Skerrett). McGraw-Hill, 2007. ISBN 0-07-149479-0.
- Thinfluence (with Malissa Wood and Dan Childs). Rodale Press, 2014.
- Eat, Drink, and Be Healthy, 3rd edition. Simon and Schuster, 2017.

== Honours and awards ==
- National Academy of Sciences, Institute of Medicine, 1998
- Ninth AACR–American Cancer Society Award for Research Excellence in Cancer Epidemiology and Prevention, 2000
- American Cancer Society Medal of Honor, 2006
- Fellow, American Association for the Advancement of Science, 2008
- IARC Medal of Honour, International Agency for Research on Cancer, 2012
- Bloomberg Manulife Prize for the Promotion of Active Health, McGill University, 2017
- Honorary Degree of Doctor of Laws, University of Dundee, Scotland, 2008
- Prince Mahidol Award in the Field of Public Health, 2025

== Reception ==
A 2013 article in The Boston Globe described Willett as the "world's most influential nutritionist".

Willett's book Eat, Drink, and Be Healthy received a high-score at Red Pen Reviews who concluded that it "provides solid science backed advice without much hype. The dietary advice can be applied to a variety of dietary patterns and preferences. Adoption of the advice is likely to lead to improved health outcomes." John Swartzberg and Sheldon Margen positively reviewed the book in the American Journal of Epidemiology, describing it as "one of the few books on nutrition and health written for the lay public that is based on a careful and thoughtful analysis of (of all things) science!".

In 2016, Semantic Scholar AI program included Willett on its list of top ten most influential biomedical researchers.

== Works ==
- Nutritional Epidemiology (1998) ISBN 0-19-512297-6
- Eat, Drink, and be Healthy: The Harvard Medical School Guide To Healthy Eating (2005) ISBN 0-684-86337-5
- Eat, Drink, and Weigh Less (2007) ISBN 1-4013-0892-9
- The Fertility Diet (2008) ISBN 0-07-149479-0
- More than 2,000 scientific articles
