= Carl Lavie =

American cardiologist

Carl J. "Chip" Lavie is an American cardiologist. He is the medical director of cardiac rehabilitation and preventive cardiology at the John Ochsner Heart and Vascular Institute in New Orleans, Louisiana. He is also a professor at the Ochsner Clinical School of the University of Queensland in Brisbane, Australia, and the editor-in-chief of the medical journal Progress in Cardiovascular Diseases.

== Education ==
Lavie received his M.D. from the Louisiana State University School of Medicine in 1983. He then completed his residency at Ochsner Medical Institutions and his fellowship in cardiovascular diseases at the Mayo Graduate School of Medicine, becoming a faculty member at the latter institution in 1989.

== Research ==
Lavie has authored two medical textbooks and hundreds of journal articles. He has also conducted research on the health benefits of running. In 2013, Lavie published a study which found that high levels of coffee consumption (four cups a day or more) was associated with a higher risk of mortality.

=== Obesity paradox ===
Lavie was one of the first researchers to report evidence of an obesity paradox in a 2002 study on patients with heart failure. In 2009, Lavie and two other researchers published a review of the literature regarding the obesity paradox among heart patients. In this review, Lavie et al. stated that "...numerous studies have documented an obesity paradox in which overweight and obese people with established CV disease...have a better prognosis compared with nonoverweight/nonobese patients." In 2014, Lavie published the book "The Obesity Paradox", in which he argues that being overweight is not a serious risk to one's health and that being fit is more important to one's health than not being overweight or obese.

== Personal life ==
Lavie is also a competitive runner. He is married to Bonnie Lavie, a former sports teacher, with whom he has four children, three of whom were in medical school as of June 2015.
