= Mutual standardisation =

Mutual Standardisation is a term used within spatial epidemiology to refer to when ecological bias results as a consequence of adjusting disease rates for confounding at the area level but leaving the exposure unadjusted and vice versa. This bias is prevented by adjusting in the same way both the exposure and disease rates. This adjustment is rarely possible as it requires data on within-area distribution of the exposure and confounder variables. (Elliot, 2001)

== See also ==
- Outline of public health
