= Ana Abraido-Lanza =

American behavioural psychologist

Ana Abraído-Lanza
- Education: New York University; City University of New York
- Scientific career
- Workplaces: New York University; Columbia University Mailman School of Public Health
- Thesis: Social role identity, social support, competence and psychological well-being among Hispanic women with arthritis (1994)

Ana Abraído-Lanza is an American behavioral psychologist who is a professor at the New York University. Her research considers the cultural and structural factors that impact mental and physical health amongst Latino communities. She serves as Vice Dean of the School of Public Health.

== Early life and education ==
Abraído-Lanza was an undergraduate student in psychology at New York University. She moved to the Graduate Center of the City University of New York for graduate studies, where she earned a master's degree and doctorate. Her doctoral research considered the social role identity, support and psychological wellbeing amongst Hispanic women. After graduating, Abraído-Lanza joined the Columbia University Mailman School of Public Health, where she worked as a postdoctoral scholar in Medical Epidemiology.

== Research and career ==
Abraído-Lanza was appointed Professor of Sociomedical Sciences at the Columbia University Mailman School of Public Health and oversaw the Initiative for Maximizing Student Development (IMSD), which looked to increase the number of people from historically underrepresented groups studying medicine. The program launched a doctoral training scheme in 2008. At Columbia, she was selected as a Provost Leadership Fellow.

Abraído-Lanza joined the New York University School of Public Health in 2018 where she became Vice Dean and Professor of Social and Behavioral Sciences. Her research considers the cultural and structural factors that impact mental and physical health amongst Latino communities, including the Latino mortality paradox - despite their socioeconomic status, Latino people have lower mortality rates than non-Latino white people. Unlike the majority of public health frameworks, Abraído-Lanza considers the positive aspects of culture that give rise to these lower mortality rates. She has shown that structural racism, in particular conditional citizenship and subjective sense of belonging, impacts the health and wellbeing of immigrants.

Abraído-Lanza played integral roles on numerous boards and committees dedicated to advancing the well-being of Latino individuals. Among her notable positions, she served on the Editorial Boards of Health Education and Behavior, the Annals of Behavioral Medicine, the International Journal of Behavioral Medicine, and Preventing Chronic Disease. Additionally, she contributed as a board member to various scientific, professional, and nonprofit organizations, including the Hispanic Serving Health Professions School. Her dedication to community health was further evident through her involvement in influential initiatives such as the Community Task Force on Preventive Services of the Centers for Disease Control and Prevention and the National Academies of Sciences, Engineering, and Medicine. Moreover, Anna Abraído-Lanza actively participated in several National Institutes of Health review groups, shaping the direction of research and funding priorities to better address the needs of Latino communities.

== Awards and honors ==
- 2008 Dalmas A. Taylor Distinguished Contributions Award
- 2013 Provost Leadership Fellow
- Abraido-Lanza received the Teaching Excellence Award from the Mailman School, where she worked.
- 2017 Student Assembly Public Health Mentoring Award

== Selected publications ==
- Abraido-Lanza, Ana; Adria N Armbrister; Flórez, Karen R.; Alejandra N Aguirre (2006). "Toward a theory-driven model of acculturation in public health research". American Journal of Public Health. 96 (8): 1342–1346. doi:10.2105/ajph.2005.064980. PMC 1522104. PMID 16809597. Wikidata Q79816132.
- Abraido-Lanza, Ana; Dohrenwend, Bruce Philip; D S Ng-Mak; J B Turner (1999). "The Latino mortality paradox: a test of the "salmon bias" and healthy migrant hypotheses". American Journal of Public Health. 89 (10): 1543–1548. doi:10.2105/ajph.89.10.1543. PMC 1508801. PMID 10511837. Wikidata Q24551250.
- Abraido-Lanza, Ana; Maria T Chao; Flórez, Karen R. (2005). "Do healthy behaviors decline with greater acculturation? Implications for the Latino mortality paradox". Social Science & Medicine. 61 (6): 1243–1255. doi:10.1016/j.socscimed.2005.01.016. PMC 3587355. PMID 15970234. Wikidata Q24612359.
- “Ana Abraído-Lanza.” The Columbia School of Social Work, https://socialwork.columbia.edu/faculty-research/faculty/full-time/ana-abraido-lanza/. Accessed 20 Mar. 2024.
- “DIRC20 Presenter: Ana Abraido-Lanza.” DIRC, https://dirc.info/presenter-anaabraidolanza. Accessed 20 Mar. 2024.
- “New Faculty: Dr. Ana F. Abraído-Lanza | NYU School of Global Public Health.” Publichealth.nyu.edu, https://publichealth.nyu.edu/events-news/news/2018/09/07/new-faculty-dr-ana-f-abraido-lanza. Accessed 20 Mar. 2024.
