= Fatty acid ratio in food =

Proportion of omega-3 to omega-6 fatty acids in a diet

Only two essential fatty acids are known to be essential for humans: alpha-linolenic acid (an omega−3 fatty acid) and linoleic acid (an omega−6 fatty acid). Closely related, these fatty acids act as competing substrates for the same enzymes. The biological effects of the ω−3 and ω−6 fatty acids are largely mediated by essential fatty acid interactions. The proportion of omega−3 to omega−6 fatty acids in a diet may have metabolic consequences. Unlike omega−3 fatty acids and omega−6 fatty acids, omega−9 fatty acids are not classed as essential fatty acids because they can be created by the human body from monounsaturated and saturated fatty acids, and are therefore not essential in the diet.

== Ratio of omega−6 to omega−3 fats in the diets of hunter-gatherers ==
It has been claimed that among hunter-gatherer populations, omega−6 fats and omega−3 fats are typically consumed in roughly a 1:1 ratio. At one extreme of the spectrum of hunter-gatherer diets, the Greenland Inuit, before the late 20th century, consumed a diet with twice as much omega−3 as omega−6, thanks to a diet rich in cold-water fish (a rich source of omega−3s) and completely devoid of omega−6-rich seed oils.

== Optimal ratio of omega−6 to omega−3 fats ==
To date, "no one knows what the optimal ratio in the diet is for these two families of fats." Science writer Susan Allport writes that the current ratio in Japan is associated with a very low incidence of heart and other diseases. A dietary ratio of 4:1 produces almost a 1:1 ratio of highly unsaturated fatty acids (HUFAs) in cell membranes."

It has been estimated that in developed countries, the ratio of omega−6s to omega−3s is closer to 15:1. Another estimate is that "[t]he diet consumed by the typical American tends to contain 14–25 times more omega-6 fatty acids than omega-3 fatty acids."

According to a 2009 review by the American Heart Association, instead of avoiding ω−6 fats, the ω−6:ω−3 ratio should be decreased by consuming more ω−3 fats. The conversion rate of linoleic acid (LA) into arachidonic acid is very low with a diet high in linolenic acid.

The maximum ω−6:ω−3 ratio allowed in dog food by the AAFCO is 30:1.

== Fish ==
Food	Citation	Serving size (g)	Omega−6 fatty acids (mg)	Omega−3 fatty acids (mg)	Ratio Omega−6 to omega−3
Salmon, wild, raw		100	172	2018	0.085
Sardines, canned in oil		1 can (90 g)	3260	1362	2.4
Sardines, canned in water		1 can (90 g)	655	1457	0.45
Tuna, canned in water		1 can (160 g)	14	460	0.030
Tuna, canned in oil		1 can (170 g)	4588	345	13.3
Mackerel, canned		1 can (360 g)	357	4970	0.072
Herring		100 g	246	2418	0.10

== Nuts and seeds ==
Food	Citation	Serving size (g)	Omega-6 fatty acids (mg)	Omega-3 fatty acids (mg)	Ratio Omega-6 to omega-3
Almonds, dry roasted		100	12065	6	2010
Cashews		100	7782	62	125
Chia seeds		100	5785	17552	0.33
Coconut, raw		100	366	-	-
Flax seeds		100	5911	22813	0.26
Hazelnuts, filberts		100	7832	87	90
Hemp seeds		100	56000	22000	2.5
Macadamia nuts, dry roasted		100	1720	259	6.6
Pecans		100	20630	986	21
Pistachios, raw		100	13200	254	52
Poppy seed		100	28291	273	104
Pumpkin seeds, whole, roasted		100	8759	77	114
Sesame seeds, whole, dried		100	21372	376	57
Sunflower seeds, kernels, dried		100	23048	74	311
Walnuts		100	38092	9079	4.2
Lentils, mature seeds, cooked, boiled, without salt		100	137	37	3.7

== See also ==
- Monounsaturated fat
- For listings of particular classes of polyunsaturated fatty acids, see:
  - Polyunsaturated fat
  - Omega−3 fatty acid
  - Omega−6 fatty acid
  - Omega−9 fatty acid
  - Conjugated linoleic acid
- Essential fatty acid – for biochemistry of most polyunsaturated fats
- Essential fatty acid interactions – for the interactions between ω-6 and ω-3 fatty acids
- Unsaturated fat
- Israeli paradox
