= Hispanic paradox =

Epidemiological finding

The Hispanic paradox is an epidemiological finding that Hispanic Americans tend to have health outcomes that paradoxically are comparable to, or in some cases better than, those of their U.S. non-Hispanic White counterparts, even though Hispanics have lower average income and education, higher rates of disability, as well as a higher incidence of various cardiovascular risk factors and metabolic diseases.

Low socioeconomic status is almost universally associated with worse population health and higher death rates everywhere in the world. The paradox usually refers in particular to low mortality among Hispanics in the United States relative to non-Hispanic Whites. According to the Centers for Disease Control's 2015 Vital Signs report, Hispanics in the United States had a 24% lower risk of mortality, as well as lower risk for nine of the fifteen leading causes of death as compared to Whites.

Researchers attribute the phenomenon to the cultural values, interpersonal context, and community context of the Hispanic population. Hispanics tend to be less stressed economically, since they tend to compare themselves to individuals in their country of origin. There is also strong social and communal support in Hispanic communities, especially for elders. Some health researchers attribute the Hispanic paradox to different eating habits, especially the relatively high intake of legumes such as beans and lentils.

Statistical biases such as the "salmon bias", which suggests that Hispanics tend to return to their country of origin towards the end of their lives, or the "healthy migrant bias", which assumes that the healthiest and strongest members of a population are most likely to migrate, have been largely refuted by researchers.

Since the 2010s, research has indicated that the Hispanic paradox is disappearing, as Latino mortality increases relative to white Americans, and cardiovascular risk factors are increasing in the Hispanic population. In 2023, a study found that the mortality advantage of Hispanics was largely erased during the COVID-19 pandemic, during which Hispanic death rates disproportionately increased.

== History ==
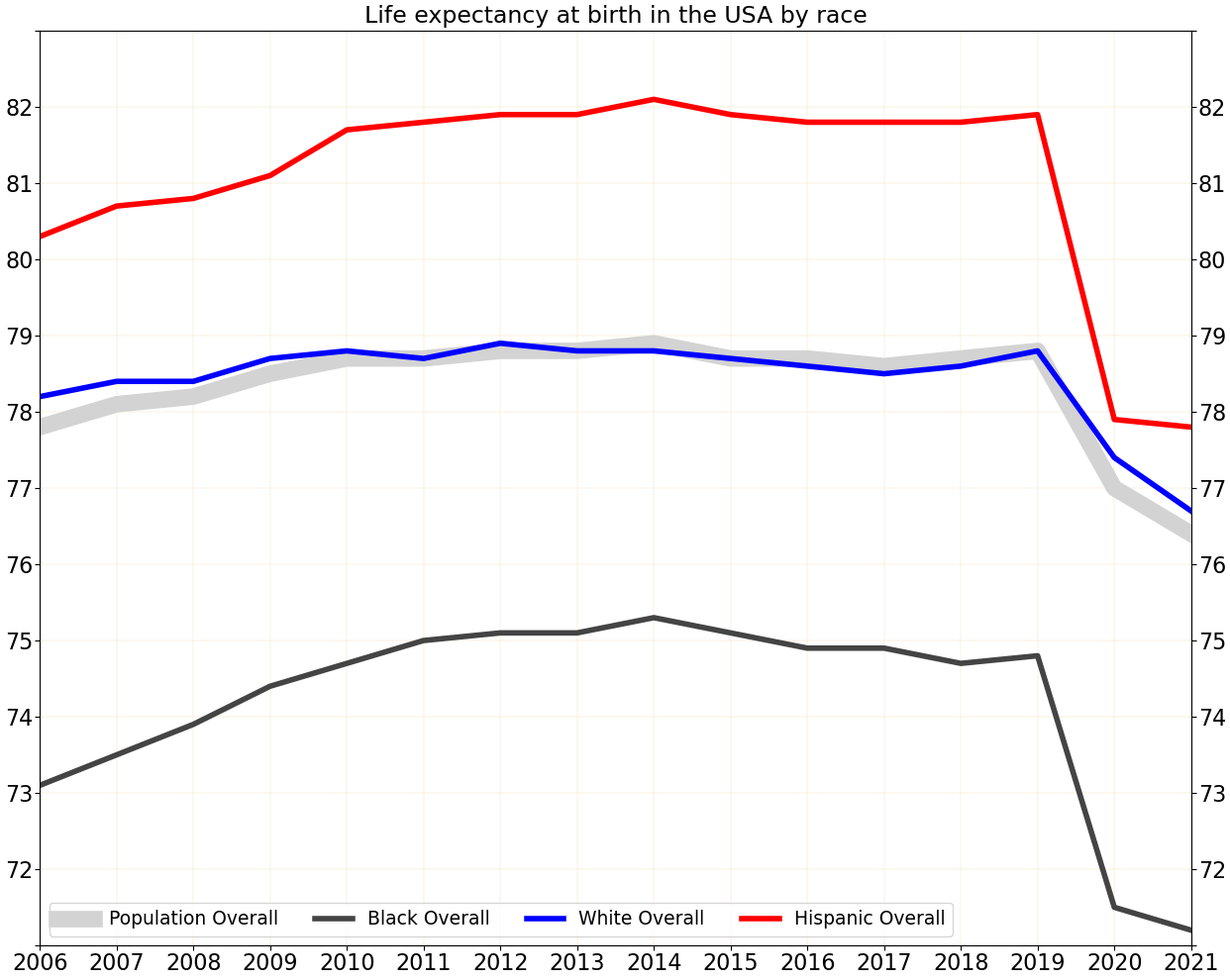
Life expectancy in the US by race, 2006 to 2024.

First coined as the Hispanic Epidemiological Paradox in 1986 by Kyriakos Markides, the phenomenon is also known as the Latino Epidemiological Paradox. According to Markides, a professor of sociomedical sciences at the University of Texas Medical Branch in Galveston, this paradox was ignored by past generations, but is now "the leading theme in the health of the Hispanic population in the United States."

The specific cause of the phenomenon is poorly understood, although the decisive factor appears to be place of birth. It appears that the Hispanic paradox cannot be explained by either the "salmon bias hypothesis" or the "healthy migrant effect", two theories that posit low mortality among immigrants due to, respectively, a possible tendency for sick immigrants to return to their home country before death and a possible tendency for new immigrants to be unusually healthy compared to the rest of their home-country population. Historical differences in smoking habits by ethnicity and place of birth may explain much of the paradox, at least at adult ages.

Others have proposed that the lower mortality of Hispanics could reflect a slower biological aging rate of Hispanics. Some believe that there is no Hispanic paradox, and that inaccurate counting of Hispanic deaths in the United States leads to an underestimate of Hispanic mortality.

== Statistical findings ==
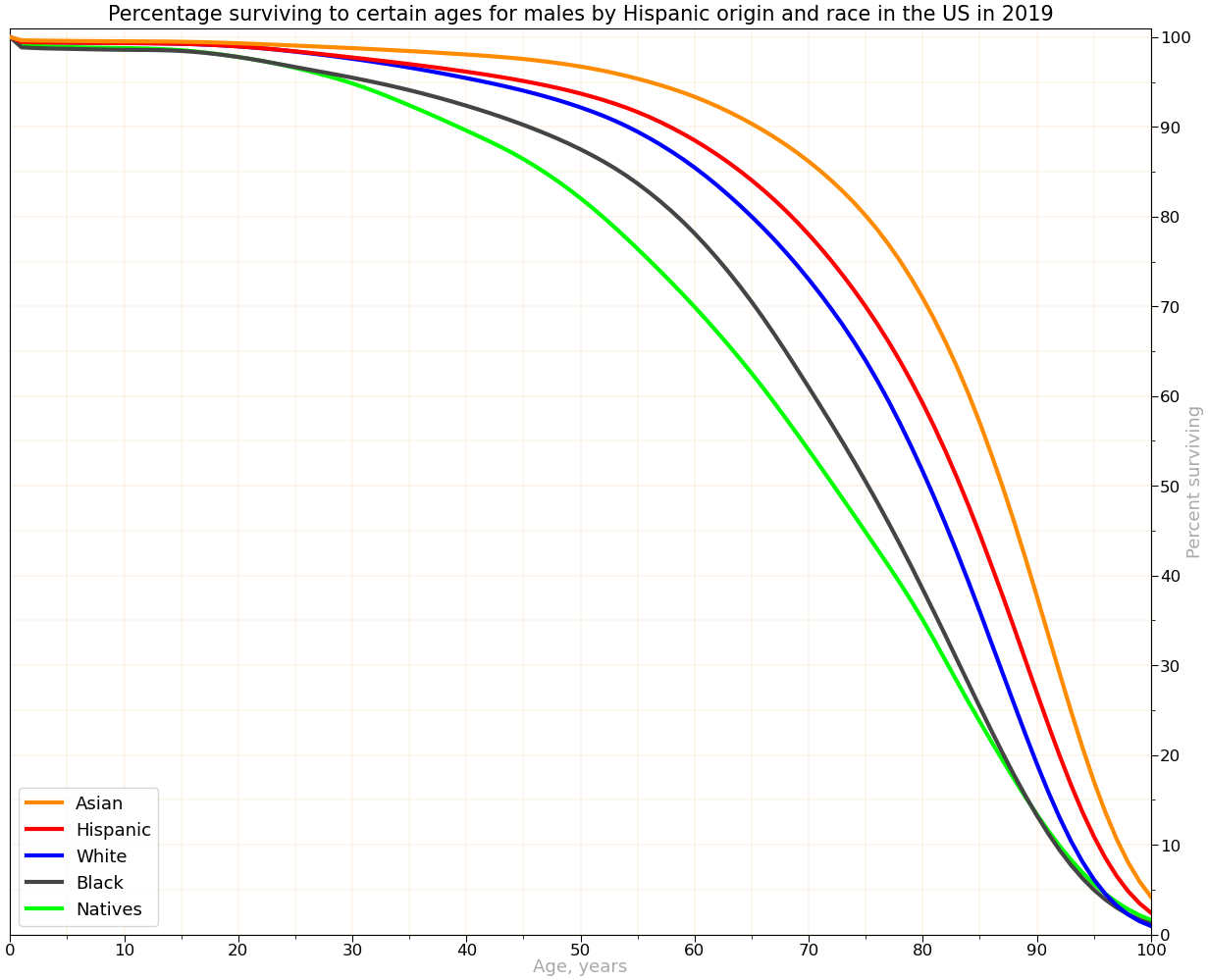
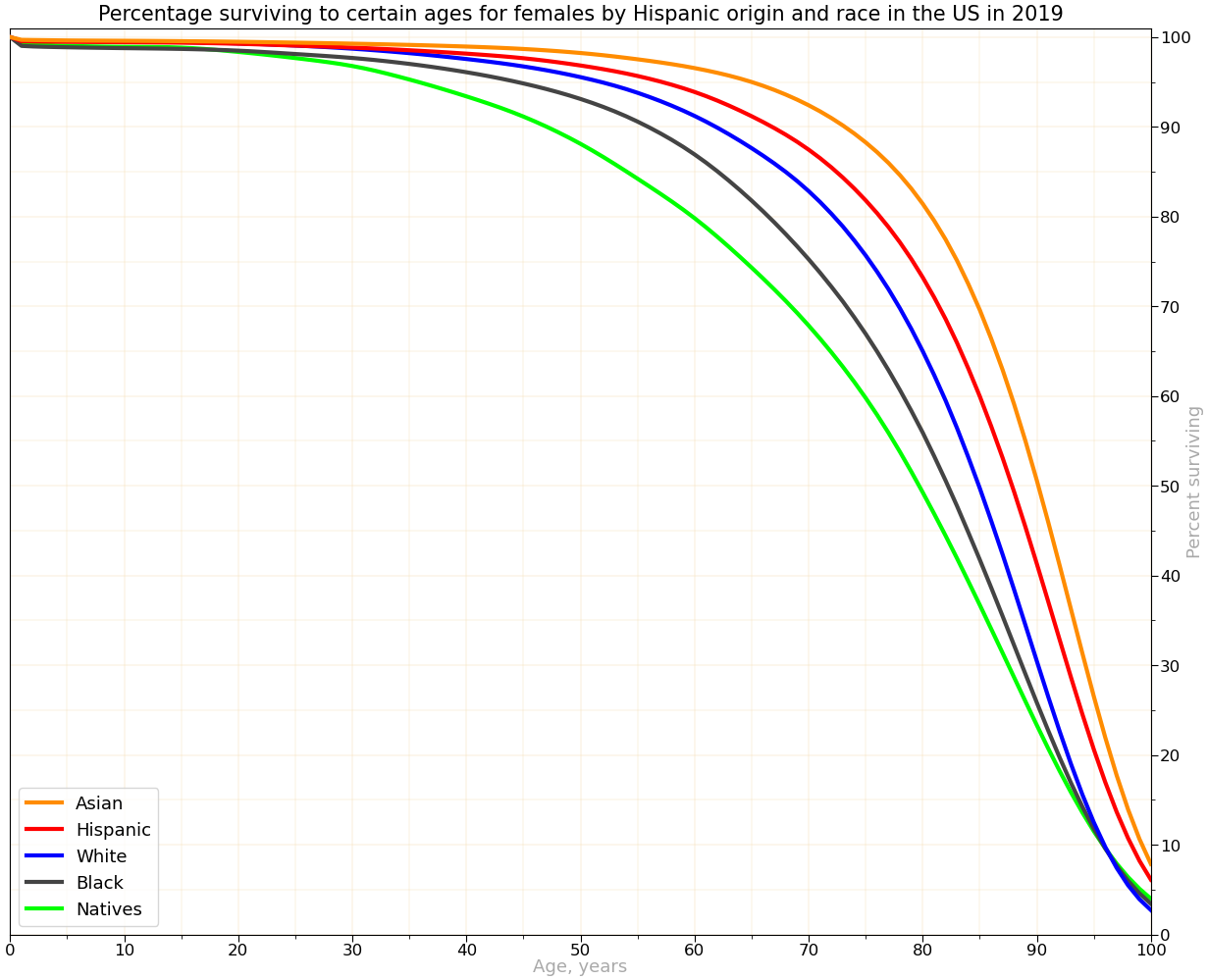
Percentage surviving to certain ages in the US in 2024 by Hispanic origin and race for male and for female
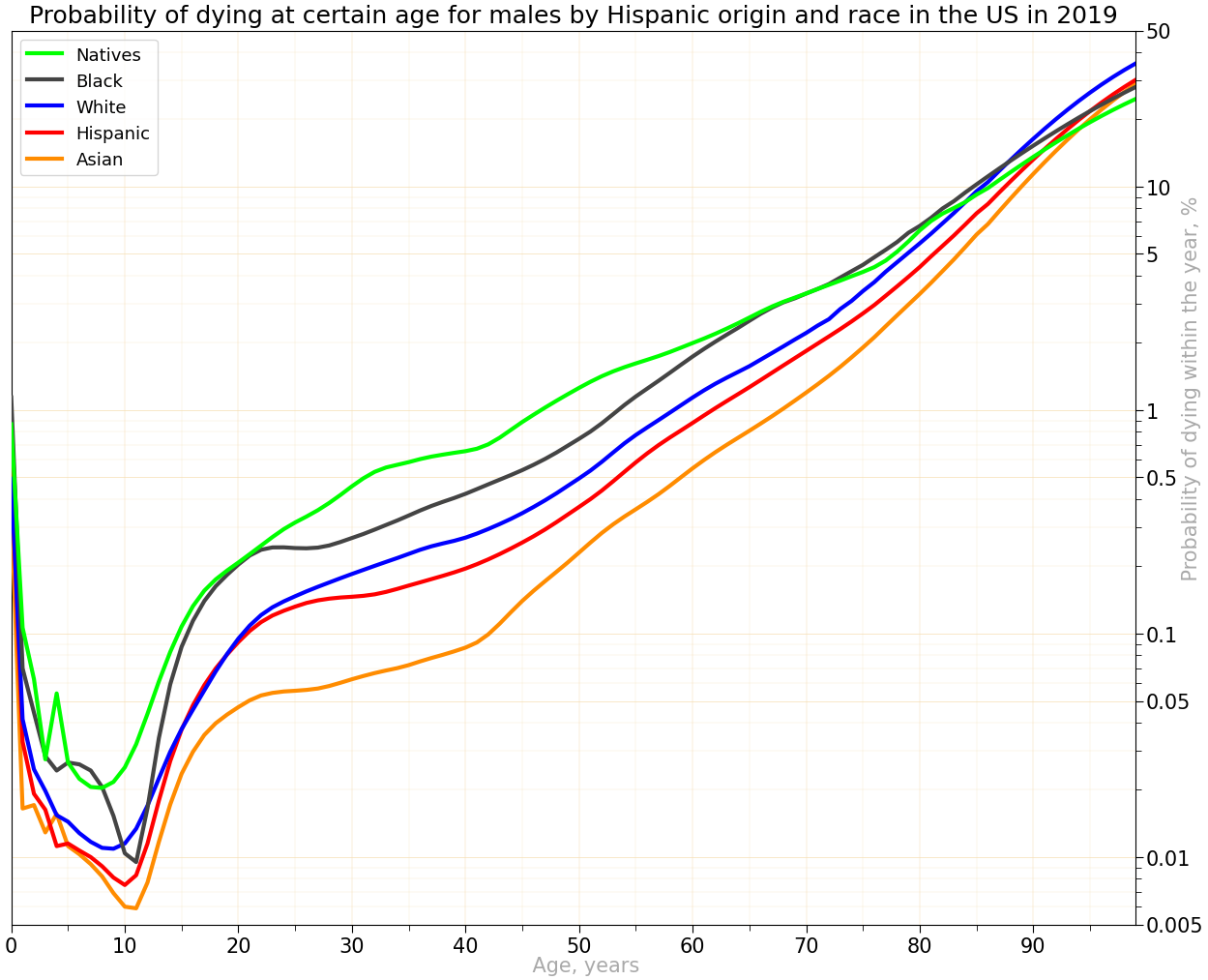
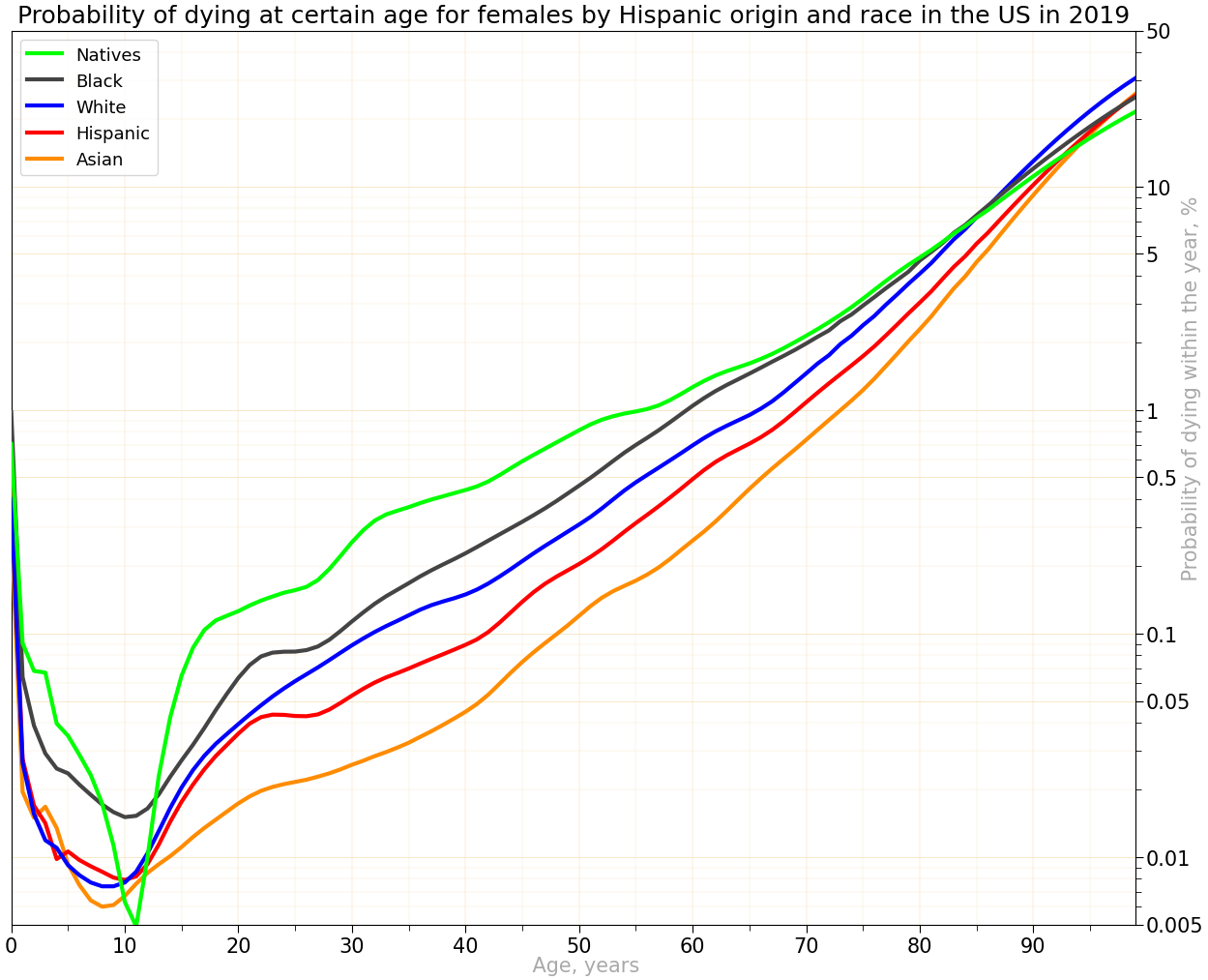
Probability of dying at various ages in the US in 2024 by Hispanic origin and race for male and for female

=== Mortality ===
Despite having lower socioeconomic status, higher rates of disability, obesity, cardiovascular disease and type 2 diabetes, most Hispanic groups, excepting Puerto Ricans, demonstrate lower or equal levels of mortality to their non-Hispanic White counterparts. The Centers for Disease Control reported in 2003 that Hispanic's mortality rate was 25 percent lower than non-Hispanic whites and 43 percent lower than African Americans. This mortality advantage most commonly found among middle-aged and elderly Hispanics. The death rates of Hispanics to non-Hispanic whites was found to exceed 1.00 in the twenties, decreases by age 45, then is severely reduced to 0.75–.90 by at age 65, persisting until death. When controlling for socioeconomic factors, the health advantage gap for Mexican Americans, the largest Hispanic population in the US, increases noticeably.

Hispanics do not have a mortality advantage over non-Hispanic Whites in all mortality rates. In 1999, they had higher rates for mortality from liver disease, cervical cancer, AIDS, homicide (males), and diabetes.

=== Infant mortality ===
Another important indicator of health is the infant mortality rate, which is also either equal to or lower than that of non-Hispanic Americans. A 2007 study by Hummer, et al. found that infants born to Mexican immigrant women in the United States have about a 10 percent lower mortality in the first hour, first day, and first week than that of infants born to non-Hispanic white, U.S.-born women. In 2003, the national Hispanic infant mortality rate was 5.7, nearly equal to that of non-Hispanic white Americans and 58 percent lower than that of African Americans.

In 2014, the children of Mexican immigrant women had a lower infant mortality rate than that of U.S.-born Mexican-American women, even though the latter population usually has a higher income and education, and are much more likely to have health insurance.

== Reasons for the paradox ==
=== Socio-economic factors ===
According to Alder and Estrove (2006), the more socioeconomically advantaged individuals are, the better their health. Access to health insurance and preventative medical services are one of the main reasons for socioeconomic health disparities. Economic hardship within the household can cause distress and affect parenting, causing health problems among children leading to depression, substance abuse, and behavior problems. Low socioeconomic status is correlated with increased rates of morbidity and mortality. Mental health disorders are an important health problem for those of low socioeconomic status; they are two to five times more likely to develop a diagnosable disorder than those of high socioeconomic status, and are more likely to face barriers to getting treatment. This lack of treatment for mental disorders can affect educational and employment opportunities and achievement.

=== Residential segregation ===
Important to the understanding of migrant community health is the increasingly stratified American society, manifested in residential segregation. Beginning in the 1970s, the low to moderate levels of income segregation in the United States began to degrade. As the rich became richer, so did their neighborhoods. This trend was inversely reflected in the poor, as their neighborhoods became poorer. As sociologist Douglas Massey explains, "As a result, poverty and affluence both became more concentrated geographically."

In 2009, Professor of public administration and economics John Yinger wrote that "one way for poor people to win the spatial competition for housing is to rent small or low-quality housing." However, he continues, low-quality housing often features serious health risks such as lead paint and animal pests. Though lead-based paint was deemed illegal in 1978, it remains on the walls of older apartments and houses, posing a serious neurological risk to children. Asthma, a possible serious health risk, also has a clear link to poverty. Asthma attacks have been associated with certain aspects of poor housing quality such as the presence of cockroaches, mice, dust, dust mites, mold, and mildew. The 1997 American Housing Survey found that signs of rats or mice are almost twice as likely to be detected in poor households as in non-poor households.

=== Cultural values ===
Speculation of a sociocultural advantage stems from the idea that many traditional Hispanic cultural values are protective in health. One such value is that of simpatia, a drive toward social harmony, which may serve to ameliorate social conflict and the negative stress-related health implications that come with it. Familismo (family-centeredness) and allocentrismo (valuing the group) are both values which emphasize the needs of the group in accordance to those of the individual.

Respeto is another familial value in which family members are largely invested in care of their elders. Emphasis on family attachment in the Latino culture is believed to foster social cohesion and a sturdy social support network, which is protective of health during adverse circumstances. Familial support has been associated with higher likelihood of taking preventative health measures and of seeking medical attention when ill. Overall psychological and physical well-being has been found to be better in individuals who come from a supportive family than those who experience family conflict, which is why the family-centered culture of Hispanics may be advantageous in health.

=== Interpersonal context ===
==== Social comparison theory ====
Social comparison theory proposes that individuals make comparisons with others, most often those of a similar group, to evaluate their own well-being and worth. The psychological implications that these comparisons present depend on the nature of the comparisons. Upward comparisons often result in negative psychological effects due to feelings of disadvantage when being compared to those higher in the hierarchy. Conversely, lateral and downward comparisons often result in satisfaction when one sees himself as better off than those lower in the hierarchy.

Latino Americans and noncitizen Latinos are expected to make lateral or downward comparisons, either to other low-economic status Latinos and/or to relatives and friends in their home country. Such downward comparisons would result in boosted self-esteem and less psychological stress, resulting in better health.

==== Social networks and support ====
Social capital is thought to be a significant moderator in the advantageous health outcomes of Latinos. It has been found that the magnitude of the effect of social integration on mortality is greater than smoking fifteen cigarettes a day. Characteristic values of Latino culture such as familismo and allocentrismo contribute to greater social cohesion and social support networks. This tight social fabric is a mechanism which fosters resilience through social support. Resilience is the ability to adapt to a disadvantageous experience and high resilience is protective in health.

== Hypotheses ==
=== Barrio advantage ===
One hypothesis for the Hispanic paradox proposes that living in the same neighborhood as people with similar ethnic backgrounds confers significant advantages to one's health. In a study of elderly Mexican-Americans, those living in areas with a higher percentage of Mexican-Americans had lower seven-year mortality as well as a decreased prevalence of medical conditions, including stroke, cancer, and hip fracture. Despite these neighborhoods' relatively high rates of poverty due to lack of formal education and a preponderance of low paying service sector jobs, residents do not have the same mortality and morbidity levels seen in similarly disadvantaged socioeconomic neighborhoods.

These neighborhoods have intact family structures, community institutions, and kinship structures that span households, all of which are thought to provide significant benefits to an individual's health. These social network support structures are especially important to the health of the elderly population as they deal with declining physical function. Another reason for this phenomenon could be that those Hispanic-Americans that live among those of similar cultural and social backgrounds are shielded from some of the negative effects of assimilation to American culture.

Characteristics of the community in which one lives can also affect health. Latino immigrants living in communities with a large proportion of Latinos experience better health than immigrants who live in communities with a smaller proportion of Latinos. This is thought to be at least in part due to greater levels of social ties within majority-Latino communities which have been associated with greater social integration and social support. While strong family ties definitively promote psychological and physical well-being, weaker ties such as those formed with other members of the community are thought to have similar health-promoting effects.

High collective efficacy, trust within the community which engenders mutually beneficial action, within Latino communities has also been shown to be protective of health, particularly in ameliorating asthma and breathing problems. Better health outcomes for those living in communities with a high proportion of Latinos have been hypothesized to result from increased information exchange facilitated through a common language and ethnicity, as well as from benefits conferred through greater social support within the community.

=== Acculturation ===
Acculturation, a phenomenon whereby individuals internalize habits and beliefs of a new culture upon being immersed in its social institutions, is also believed to influence the health of Latinos in the United States. In this case, acculturation of Latino immigrants would mean the relinquishment of the characteristic sociocultural aspects of Latino culture listed above in favor of characteristics which are more representative of the American lifestyle. Research has given mixed results regarding the idea that the health of Latino immigrants worsen as length of stay in the United States increases.

As Latinos adopt American tendencies, for example, it is thought that the strong social support networks of tight-knit Latino communities are eroded, and the resulting stress begets worse health outcomes. On the other hand, greater acculturation to the United States has been associated with worsening in some health behaviors, including higher rates of smoking and alcohol use, but improvement in others, such as physical activity.

Measurements of acculturation, such as length of time in the United States, proportion of Latino friends, and language use are proxy measures and as such are not completely precise. It is possible that confounding factors such as socioeconomic status influence the mixed effects of acculturation seen in health outcomes and behaviors.

The extent of a Hispanic American's acculturation in the United States, or their assimilation to mainstream American culture, is relative to his or her health. One of the main negative effects of acculturation on health has been on substance abuse. More assimilated Latinos have higher rates of illicit drug use, alcohol consumption, and smoking, especially among women. Another negative effect of acculturation is changes in diet and nutrition. More acculturated Latinos eat fewer/less fruits, vegetables, vitamins, fiber and protein and consume more fat than their less acculturated counterparts.

One of the most significant impacts of acculturation on Latino health is birth outcomes. Studies have found that more acculturated Latinas have higher rates of low birthweight, premature births, teenage pregnancy and undesirable prenatal and postnatal behaviors such as smoking or drinking during pregnancy, and lower rates of breastfeeding. Acculturation and greater time in the United States has also been associated with negative mental health impacts. US-born Latinos or long-term residents of the United States had higher rates of mental illness than recent Latino immigrants.

Foreign-born Mexican Americans are at significantly lower risk of suicide and depression than those born in the United States. The increased rates of mental illness is thought to be due to increased distress associated with alienation, discrimination and Mexican Americans attempting to advance themselves economically and socially stripping themselves of traditional resources and ethnically based social support.

=== Healthy migrant effect ===
The "healthy migrant effect" hypothesizes that the selection of healthy Hispanic immigrants into the United States is reason for the paradox. International immigration statistics demonstrate that the mortality rate of immigrants is lower than in their country of origin. In the United States, foreign-born individuals have better self-reported health than American-born respondents. Hispanic immigrants have better health than those living in the US for a long amount of time.

=== Salmon Bias ===
A second popular hypothesis, called the "Salmon Bias", attempts to factor in the occurrence of returning home. This hypothesis purports that many Hispanic people return home after temporary employment, retirement, or severe illness, meaning that their deaths occur in their native land and are not taken into account by mortality reports in the United States. This hypothesis considers those people as "statistically immortal" because they artificially lower the Hispanic mortality rate.

Certain studies hint that it could be reasonable. These studies report that though return migration, both temporary and permanent, depend upon specific economic and social situations in communities, up to 75 percent of households in immigrant neighborhoods do some kind of return migration from the U.S. However, Abraido-Lanza, et al. found in 1999 that the "Salmon Hypothesis" cannot account for the lower mortality of Hispanics in the US because, according to their findings, the Hispanic paradox is still present when non-returning migrants are observed (e.g. Cubans).

=== Slow biological aging ===
Horvath et al. (2013) have proposed that the lower mortality of Hispanics could reflect a slower biological aging rate of Hispanics. This hypothesis is based on the finding that blood and saliva from Hispanics ages more slowly than that of non-Hispanic whites, African Americans, and other populations according to a biomarker of tissue age known as epigenetic clock.

== Comparison with other ethnicities ==
One of the most important aspects of this phenomenon is the comparison of Hispanics' health to non-Hispanic African Americans' health. Both the current and historical poverty rates for Hispanic and non-Hispanic African American populations in the United States are consistently starkly higher than that of non-Hispanic white and non-Hispanic Asian Americans. Dr. Hector Flores explains that "You can predict in the African–American population, for example, a high infant-mortality rate, so we would think a [similar] poor minority would have the same health outcomes." However, he said, the health poor outcomes are not present in the Hispanic population. For example, the age-adjusted mortality rate for Hispanics living in Los Angeles County was 52 percent less than the blacks living in the same county.

=== Comparison to non-Hispanic white Americans ===
Although Hispanic Americans are twice more likely to be living under the poverty line and three times more likely to not have health insurance than non-Hispanic white Americans, they have a longer life span than them by 3 years. More Hispanics, than any other racial group, are uninsured and are in general less likely to use medical care. The median life span of Hispanic Americans is an average of 81.8 years and non-Hispanic white Americans have an average of 78.8 years. This could be explained from scientist taking DNA samples from multiple ethnic groups, the blood from Latino aged more slowly than any other group.

In 2012, new cancer cases of all sites among Hispanic men and Non-Hispanic men had a ratio of 0.7, Hispanic men having 362.2 and Non-Hispanic men having 489.9. In comparison to non-Hispanic Whites, Hispanic men are 10 percent less likely to be diagnosed with prostate cancer. Hispanic women, compared to NHW, were found to be 30 percent less likely to be diagnosed with breast cancer.

== 21st century waning of the paradox ==
Since the 21st century, a number of studies have published results which contradict the Hispanic paradox, suggesting that the health status of Hispanic Americans is declining. These findings include a higher incidence of cardiovascular disease risk factors among Hispanics, higher rates or obesity, increasing deaths from stroke even as white deaths remain stable, and a larger increase in deaths from heart failure.

Other researchers have predicted that the paradox will disappear as obesity rates rise rapidly among Hispanic males, in particular. A 2023 study published found that the Hispanic mortality advantage had been erased by the COVID-19 pandemic. Hispanic death rates increased at a much higher rate than White Americans death rates, during this period.

== Criticism ==
Some public health researchers have argued that the Hispanic paradox is not actually a national phenomenon in the United States. In 2006, Smith and Bradshaw argued that no Hispanic paradox exists. They maintain that life expectancy was nearly equal for non-Hispanic White and Hispanic females, but less close for non-Hispanic White and Hispanic males.

In 2007, Turra and Goldman argued that the paradox is concentrated among the foreign born from specific national origins, and is only present in those of middle to older ages. At younger ages, they explain, deaths are highly related to environmental factors such as homicides and accidents. Deaths at older ages, they maintain, are more related to detrimental health-related behaviors and health status at younger ages. Therefore, immigration-related processes only offer survival protection to those at middle and older ages; the negative impact of assimilation into poor neighborhoods is higher on the mortality of immigrants at a younger age.

In contrast, Palloni and Arias in 2004 hypothesized that this phenomenon is most likely caused by across-the-board bias in underestimating mortality rates, caused by ethnic misidentification or an overstatement of ages. These errors could also be related to mistakes in matching death records to the National Health Interview Survey, missing security numbers, or complex surnames.

Although it may not mean progress for all Hispanics, as of 2019, some Hispanic migrants' lifestyles were drastically improving within the United States due to Latino unemployment being at an all-time low of 4.2%. The low unemployment rates have enabled families to have multiple streams of income by individuals working more than one job.

== See also ==
- Ancestry and health
- Immigrant paradox
- List of paradoxes
- Mexican paradox
- Population groups in biomedicine
