= Cuomo's paradox =

Contradiction observed in epidemiology

Cuomo's paradox is the observation of factors associated with disease prevention which have the opposite association with disease survival. Research has highlighted occurrences of excess body mass, high cholesterol and moderate alcohol consumption.

== Origin ==
The concept was proposed by biomedical scientist Raphael E. Cuomo in a publication in the Journal of Nutrition. Cuomo analyzed clinical and epidemiological data suggesting that common nutritional risk factors including obesity, alcohol consumption, and cholesterol often play contrasting roles in disease prevention versus survival outcomes. The concept was later expanded in discussions about cancer, cannabis, and precision health. Public interest grew after an Instagram post by Princess Leonor of Spain sparked online debate on Reddit.

== Scientific discussion ==
Analyses have proposed integrating the concept into stage-specific clinical guidance, suggesting that counselling after diagnosis may differ from primary prevention advice. Related work has examined analogous questions in cardiology, tumor biology including redox homeostasis, and frameworks for medical artificial intelligence.

Reporting summarized potential differences between prevention-oriented dietary patterns and post-diagnosis survival associations, including accounts that factors commonly viewed as unhealthy may increase disease risk yet correlate with improved survival in some settings. Additional commentary considered applications in oncology and stage-specific pharmacologic care, and reports have highlighted claims that supplements viewed as harmful in prevention contexts do not always show adverse associations with survival after diagnosis.

== Public reception ==
The paradox attracted broader public attention, which emphasized its relevance to both individual dietary choices and systemic healthcare spending. Additional perspectives focused on the implications of aligning diet with one's health trajectory.

Some commentators have described Cuomo's paradox as a notable development, citing its potential impact on dietary policy and personalized care, and its relevance for stage-specific clinical guidelines.

== See also ==
- Obesity paradox
- Nutritional epidemiology
