= Progress in Cardiovascular Diseases =

- Discipline: Cardiology
- Language: English
- Edited by: Carl Lavie

Publication details
- History: 1958-present
- Publisher: Elsevier
- Frequency: Bimonthly
- Impact factor: 6.763 (2019)

Standard abbreviations
- ISO 4: Prog. Cardiovasc. Dis.

Indexing
- CODEN: PCVDAN
- ISSN: 0033-0620 (print); 1873-1740 (web)
- OCLC no.: 1624043

Links
- Journal homepage; Online access; Online archive

Progress in Cardiovascular Diseases is a bimonthly peer-reviewed medical journal covering cardiology. It was established in 1958 and is published by Elsevier. The Editor-in-Chief is Leandro Slipczuk (Montefiore Health System/Albert Einstein College of Medicine). According to the Journal Citation Reports, the journal has a 2025 impact factor of 10.6 .
