= Hydroperoxyeicosatetraenoic acid =

Hydroperoxyeicosatetraenoic acid (HPETE) may refer to:

- HPETE anion
- 5-HPETE
- 5(S)-HPETE(1-)
- 8-HPETE
- 8(S)-HPETE(1-)
- 9-HPETE
- 9(R)-HPETE
- 12-HPETE
- 12(S)-HPETE(1-)
- 12(R)-HPETE(1-)
- (S)-12-HpETE
- (R)-12-hpete
- 15-HPETE
- 15(S)-HPETE(1-)
- (S)-15-hpete
