= Outline of public health =

Overview of and topical guide to public health

The following outline is provided as an overview of and topical guide to public health:

Public health has been defined as "the science and art of preventing disease", prolonging life, and improving quality of life through organized efforts and informed choices of society, organizations (public and private), communities, and individuals.

== Nature of public health ==
=== Concepts ===
- Communicable disease (infection)
- Non-communicable disease

=== Disciplines ===
- Bacteriology
- Biostatistics
- Environmental health
- Epidemiology
- Health administration
- Health policy
- Health politics
- Health education
- Occupational safety and health

== Methods of public health ==
=== Prevention ===
- Health promotion
- Healthy community design
- Environmental protection

== Theories of public health ==
- Germ theory of disease
