= Mexican paradox =

Paradox regarding low birth weight among Mexicans

The Mexican paradox is the observation that Mexicans exhibit a surprisingly low incidence of low birth weight (especially foreign-born Mexican mothers), contrary to what would be expected from their socioeconomic status (SES). This appears as an outlier in graphs correlating SES with low-birth-weight rates. The medical causes of lower rates of low birth weights among birthing Mexican mothers has been called into question.

The Hispanic paradox refers to the same phenomenon observed across the populations of South and Central America, where Mexicans remain the healthier.

== Description ==
The results of a study showed that the mean birth weight of Mexican-American babies was 3.34 kg (7.37 lbs), while that of non-Hispanic White babies was 3.39 kg (7.48 lbs.). This finding re-emphasized the independence of mean birth weight and LBW. This however did not refute the discrepancies in LBW for Mexicans. The study also showed that the overall preterm birth rate was higher among Mexican Americans (10.6%) than non-Hispanic Whites (9.3%). In North Carolina, from 1996 to 2000, the infant death rate was 6.1 for Mexican-born infants, in comparison to 6.6 for White infants, and 15 for Black infants. The overall hypothesis of the authors was that this finding reflected an error in recorded gestational age, described in a strongly bimodal birth-weight distribution at young gestational ages for Mexican-Americans.

Many external effects come into play, such as the Mexican diet, extended family ties, low levels of stress, strong religious beliefs and strong ties to their communities. A 1995 study suggested that the Virgin of Guadeloupe encouraged healthy births thanks to its iconic pregnancy symbolism. Another study suggested that resistance to changes in diet is responsible for the positive birth weight association for Mexican-American mothers. Yet another study showed that Mexicans blend traditional and modern medicine, a potential explanation for the paradox.

It was also observed that, the longer Mexican women live in the United States, the more their infant mortality risks increased. Lower occurrences of periodontal disease with Mexican-American women was also suggested as an explanation for the Mexican paradox. Another study revealed that, beyond healthy births, Mexican infants also have lower developmental outcomes in their development years.

A 2014 study concluded that the Mexican paradox is disappearing slowly, most of the comparison data between Mexican infants and White infants being fairly similar in recent years. Another 2016 study showed that the Mexican paradox erodes in the third generation of the immigrated family.

It was also verified that Mexicans have less high blood pressure, cardiovascular diseases and most cancers than the US population in general.

== See also ==
- French paradox
- Hispanic paradox
- List of paradoxes
- Low birth-weight paradox
