= Katherine Flegal =

American epidemiologist

Katherine M. Flegal
- Education: University of California, Berkeley, Cornell University, University of Pittsburgh
- Known for: Obesity research
- Scientific career
- Fields: Epidemiology
- Workplaces: Centers for Disease Control
- Thesis: Anthropometric evaluation of obesity in epidemiologic research on risk factors: blood pressure and obesity in the health examination survey (1982)
- Doctoral advisor: Jere Haas

Katherine Mayhew Flegal is an American epidemiologist and senior scientist at the Centers for Disease Control and Prevention's National Center for Health Statistics. She is one of the most highly cited scientists in the field of the epidemiology of obesity according to Thomson Reuters and has been called "one of the great epidemiologists" by former FDA Commissioner David A. Kessler.

== Education and career ==
Flegal was born in Berkeley, California, where she grew up. She earned a bachelor's degree in anthropology from the University of California, Berkeley (UC) in 1967 and lived in Turkey for 7 months. Following that she had a job as a programmer trainee at the Alameda County Data Processing Center and became responsible for its food stamp program. This gave her extensive experience in data management, coding, and record keeping. After three years and some community college courses in chemistry and biology, Flegal returned to UC to earn a second bachelor’s degree, in food and nutrition.

Next Flegal completed Master's and Ph.D. degrees at Cornell University, expanding her interests in statistics and epidemiology and receiving her Ph.D. in 1982. When a post-doctoral position at the University of Pittsburgh offered little opportunity for research, Flegal completed a second master's degree there, in public health (MPH). In 1987, after working at the University of Michigan's biostatistics department, Flegal began working at the Centers for Disease Control (CDC).

== Research ==
Flegal is well known for a series of influential and highly cited articles on the prevalence of obesity in U.S. children and adults. In 1994, Flegal and her CDC co-authors were among the first to publish data indicating that the percentage of overweight people in the United States had been increasing from the 1980s onwards. Their paper appeared in the Journal of the American Medical Association (JAMA). In addition, she was a major contributor to the development of the 2000 CDC growth charts, used in the U.S. to assess the growth patterns of infants and children.

In 2005, Flegal and co-authors from CDC and NIH published a study in JAMA which found that being overweight was associated with lower mortality than normal weight and that obesity was associated with slightly higher mortality. The study received considerable opposition, in part because its conclusions differed from those of another paper published by senior CDC authors in March 2004. After considerable discussion, the CDC accepted Flegal's figures as correct. Flegal herself has stated "Our paper was straightforward and defensible, used only publicly available data, and corrected the errors in several previous papers on the topic". Flegal's article received CDC's highest science award, the Charles C. Shepard award, in 2006.

In 2013, Flegal was the lead author of a systematic review and meta-analysis published in JAMA regarding the association of overweight and obesity with mortality. In a large sample, drawn from other countries as well as the U.S., overweight people had lower mortality relative to people of normal weight. The work examined the results of 97 studies that had included 2.88 million people.

I think that when you find a result that you don’t expect, the interesting thing ought to be, how can we look into this in a different way? Not just to say that this is giving the wrong message so it should be suppressed. Because that’s not really science, in my opinion. - Katherine Flegal, 2022

=== Reaction ===
Flegal's work has been criticized by Walter Willett of the Harvard School of Public Health, who called her 2013 meta-analysis paper a "pile of rubbish ... No one should waste their time reading it." Willett was subsequently admonished for his unseemly behavior towards Flegal in an editorial and feature article in Nature, one of the world's pre-eminent scientific journals.

Jeffrey Scott Flier, the dean of Harvard Medical School, convened a panel of experts to discuss the paper at Harvard on February 20, 2013. The panel's members suggested that Flegal's meta-analysis paper contained methodological errors, and criticized the selection criteria used for washing out too many people. Harvard's own subsequent analysis supported its position, but also received criticisms over how the researchers determined who to include.

Many researchers accept the results of Flegal's 2005 and 2013 papers and see them as an illustration of what is known as the "obesity paradox". In 2021, Diana Thomas described Flegal's 2013 meta-analysis as "the gold standard" of obesity research.

In 2021, Flegal published a paper about her experiences with her 2005 and 2013 papers, concluding "Scientific findings should be evaluated on their merits, not on the basis of whether they fit a desired narrative."
