= French paradox =

Observation that heart disease in French people is much less than is expected

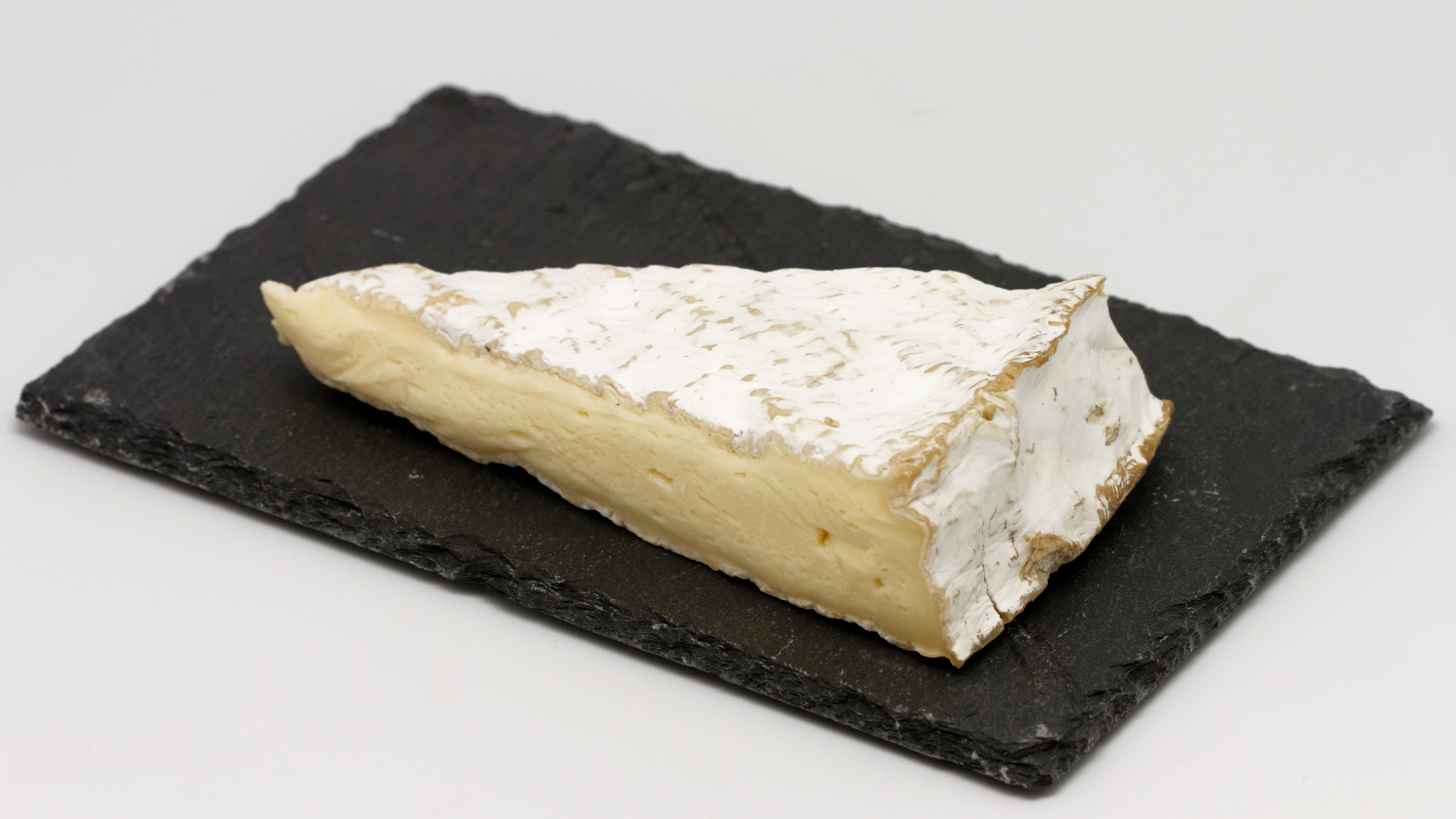
Cheese, like this Brie de Meaux, is high in saturated fats, and is a popular food in French cuisine.

The French paradox is an apparently paradoxical epidemiological observation that French people have a relatively low incidence of coronary heart disease (CHD), while having a diet relatively rich in saturated fats, in apparent contradiction to the widely held belief that the high consumption of such fats is a risk factor for CHD. The paradox is that if the thesis linking saturated fats to CHD is valid, the French ought to have a higher rate of CHD than comparable countries where the per capita consumption of such fats is lower.

It has also been suggested that the French paradox is an illusion, created in part by differences in the way that French authorities collect health statistics, as compared to other countries, and in part by the long-term effects, in the coronary health of French citizens, of changes in dietary patterns that were adopted years earlier.

== Identifying and quantifying the French paradox ==
In 1991, Serge Renaud, a scientist from Bordeaux University, France—considered today the father of the phrase—presented the results of his scientific study into the term and actual scientific data behind the perception of the phrase. This was followed by a public documentary broadcast on the American CBS News television channel, 60 Minutes.

In 1991, Renaud extended his studies in partnership with then junior researchers, cardiologist Michel de Lorgeril and dietician Patricia Salen. The three enhanced Renaud's study, with their paper concluding that: a diet based on southwestern Mediterranean cuisine (which is high in omega-3 oils, antioxidants and includes "moderate consumption" of red wine) created lower cases of cancer, myocardial infarction and cardiovascular disease; partly through increasing HDL cholesterol whilst reducing LDL cholesterol.

== Statistical illusion hypothesis ==
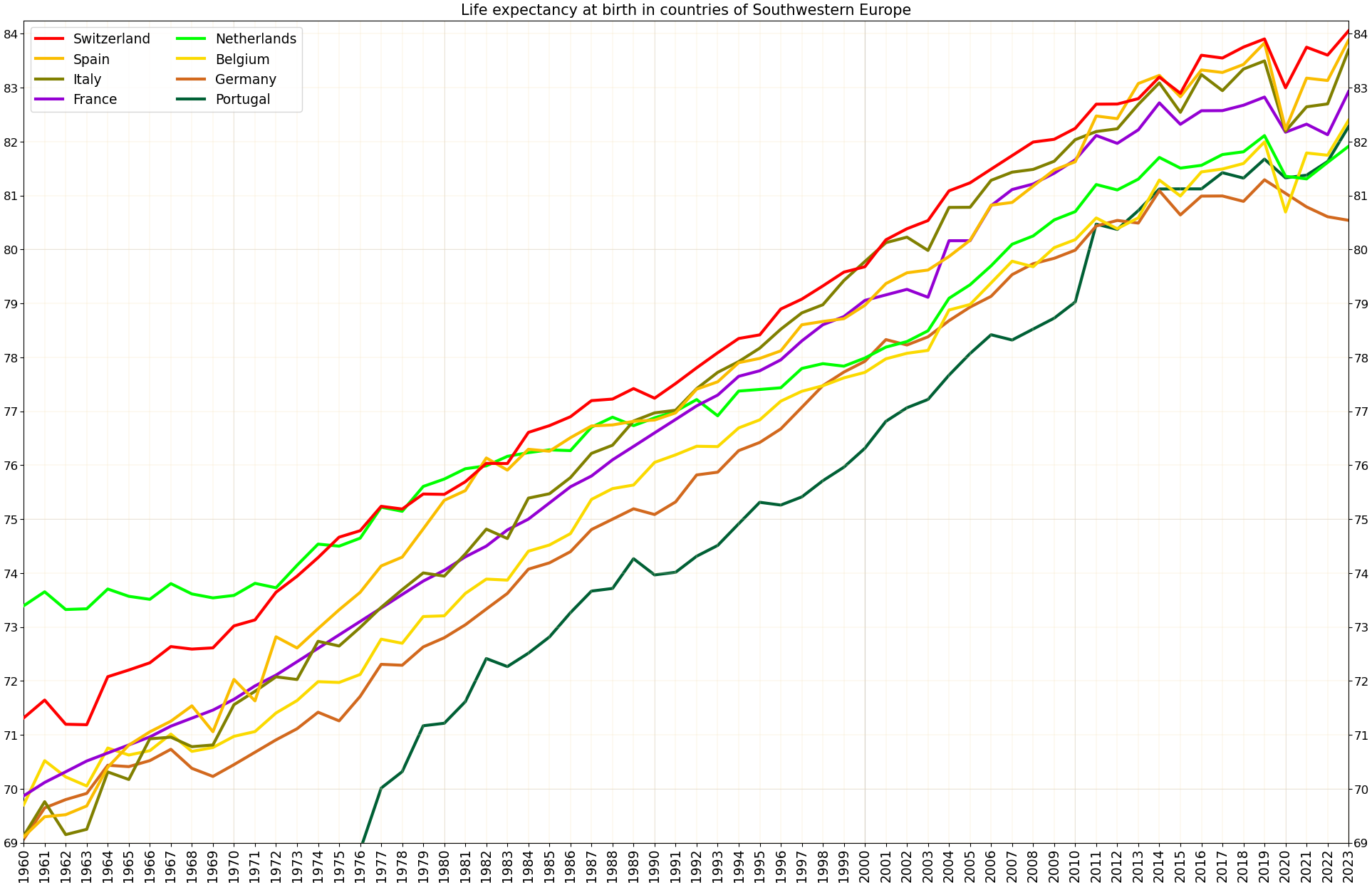
The French paradox does not have a noticeable impact on overall life expectancy in the country: life expectancy in France is similar to that in neighboring countries

In 1999, Malcolm Law and Nicholas Wald published a study in the British Medical Journal, using data from a 1994 study of alcohol and diet to explain how the French paradox might actually be an illusion, caused by two statistical distortions.

First, Law and Wald attributed about 20% of the difference in the observed rates of CHD between France and the United Kingdom to the under-certification of CHD in France, relative to the UK.

Second, Law and Wald presented a time-lag hypothesis: if there is a delay between increasing serum cholesterol concentrations and any subsequent increase in ischaemic heart disease mortality, then the current rate of mortality from CHD is more likely to be linked to past levels of serum cholesterol and fat consumption than to current serum cholesterol levels and patterns of fat consumption. They wrote,

We propose that the difference is due to the time lag between increases in consumption of animal fat and serum cholesterol concentrations, and the resulting increase in mortality from heart disease—similar to the recognised time lag between smoking and lung cancer. Consumption of animal fat and serum cholesterol concentrations increased only recently in France, but did so decades ago in Britain.

Evidence supports this explanation: mortality from heart disease across countries, including France, correlates strongly with levels of animal fat consumption and serum cholesterol in the past (30 years ago) but only weakly to recent levels. Based on past levels, mortality data for France are not discrepant

In addition, the French population has become increasingly overweight. A study published by the French Institute of Health and Medical Research (INSERM) revealed an increase in obesity from 8.5% in 1997 to 14.5% in 2009, with women showing a greater tendency toward obesity than men.

== Impact ==
=== Cultural impact ===
The overall impact of the popular perception, in the English-speaking world, that the French paradox is a real phenomenon, has been to give added credibility to health claims associated with specific French dietary practices.

This was seen most dramatically when, in 1991, an early account of the then-novel concept of the French paradox was aired in the United States on 60 Minutes. The broadcast left the impression that France's high levels of red wine consumption accounted for much of the country's lower incidence of cardiac disease. Within a year, the consumption of red wine in the United States had increased by 40% and some wine sellers began promoting their products as "health food."

The cultural impact of the French paradox can be seen in the large number of book titles in the diet-and-health field that purport to give the reader access to the secrets behind the paradox:

- The Fat Fallacy: The French Diet Secrets to Permanent Weight Loss (William Clower, 2003);
- The French Don't Diet Plan: 10 Simple Steps to Stay Thin for Life (William Clower, 2006)
- French Women Don't Get Fat (Mireille Guiliano, 2004, which became a #1 best-seller in 2006)
- Cholesterol and The French Paradox (Frank Cooper, 2009);
- The French Women Don't Get Fat Cookbook (Mireille Guiliano, 2010).

Other books sought to boost their credibility by reference to the French paradox. The American edition of The Dukan Diet, written by Pierre Dukan, a Paris-based doctor, is marketed with the subtitle, "The real reason the French stay thin".

=== Scientific impact ===
The existence of the French paradox has caused some researchers to speculate that the link between dietary consumption of saturated fats and coronary heart disease might not be as strong as had previously been thought. This has resulted in a review of the earlier studies that suggested this link.

Some researchers have thrown into question the entire claimed connection between natural saturated fat consumption and cardiovascular disease. In 2006, this view received some indirect support from the results of the Nurses' Health Study run by the Women's Health Initiative. After accumulating approximately 8 years of data on the diet and health of 49,000 post-menopausal American women, the researchers found that the balance of saturated versus unsaturated fats did not appear to affect heart disease risk, whereas the consumption of trans fat was associated with significantly increased risk of cardiovascular disease.

Similarly, the authors of a 2009 review of dietary studies concluded that there was insufficient evidence to establish a causal link between consumption of saturated fats and coronary heart disease risk.

== Possible explanations ==
=== Explanations based on the high per capita consumption of red wine in France ===
It has been suggested that France's high red wine consumption is a primary factor in the trend. This hypothesis was expounded in a 60 Minutes broadcast in 1991. The program catalysed a large increase in North American demand for red wines from around the world. It is believed that one of the components of red wine potentially related to this effect is resveratrol; however, the authors of a 2003 study concluded that the amount of resveratrol absorbed by drinkers of red wine is small enough that it is unlikely to explain the paradox.

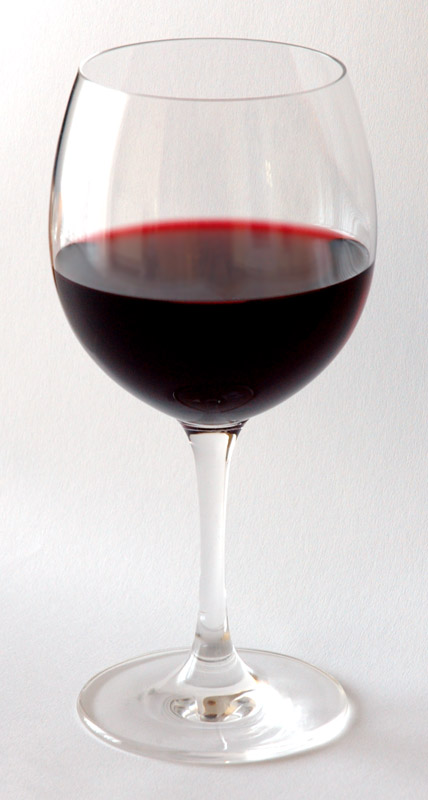
Red wine was considered a possible explanation, but proved unlikely to explain the paradox.

=== Explanations based on multiple factors ===
In "Lifestyle in France and the United States" (2010), one study reviewed identifies three major factors likely to be involved in the paradox:

- Walking (On average, French people walk briskly much more often than Americans.)
- Water (On average, French people drink more water and fewer sweetened drinks than Americans.)
- Fruit and vegetables (On average, French people consume more fresh fruits and vegetables than Americans do.)

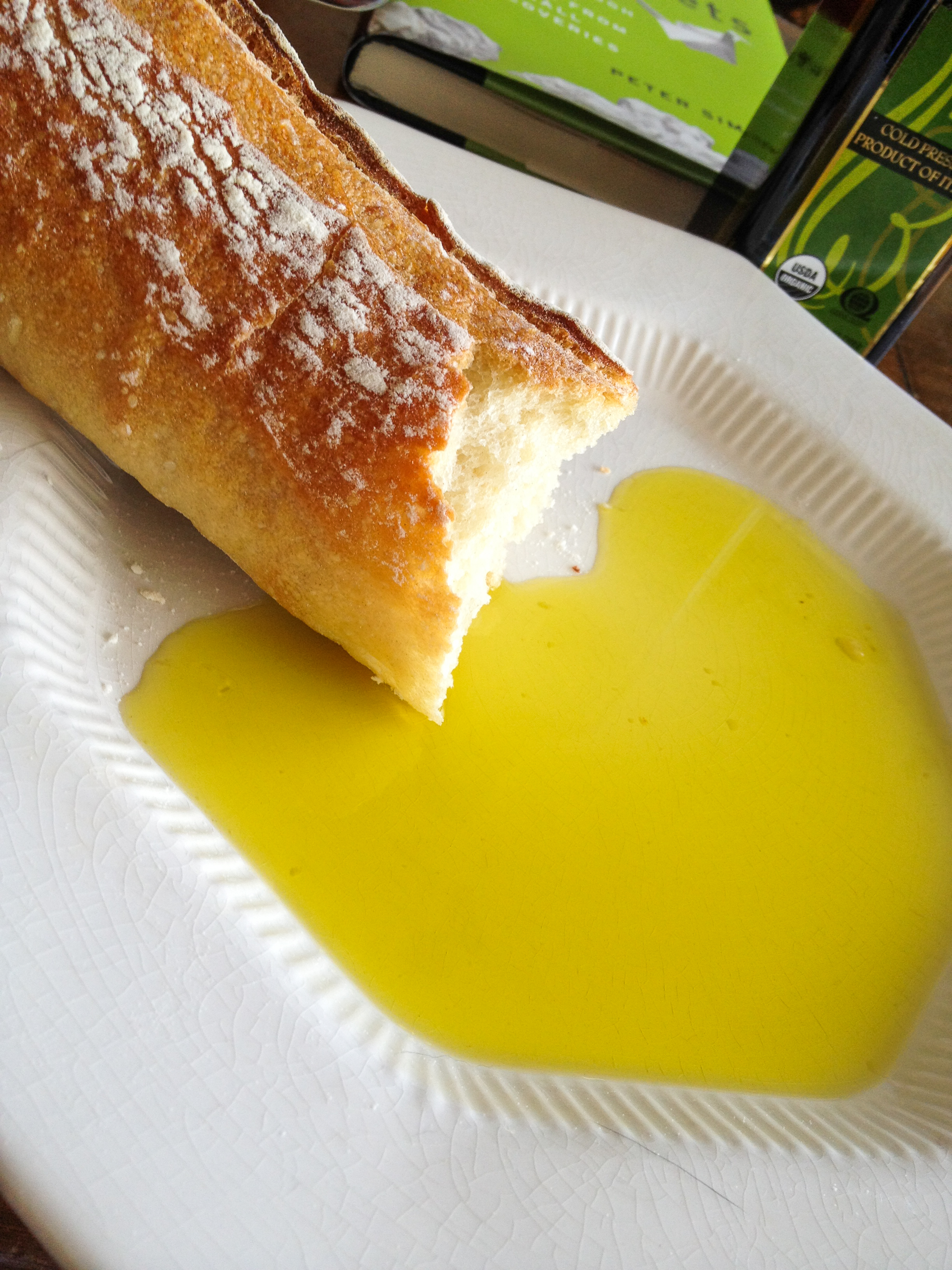
Extra virgin olive oil and baguette, often considered a symbol of French culture

In his 2003 book, The Fat Fallacy: The French Diet Secrets to Permanent Weight Loss, Will Clower suggests the French paradox may be narrowed down to a few key factors, namely:

- Good fats versus bad fats – French people get up to 80% of their fat intake from dairy and vegetable sources, including whole milk, cheeses, and whole milk yogurt.
- Higher quantities of fish (at least three times a week).
- Smaller portions, eaten more slowly and divided among courses that let the body begin to digest food already consumed before more food is added.
- Lower sugar intake – American low-fat and no-fat foods often contain high concentrations of sugar. French diets avoid these products preferring full-fat versions without added sugar.
- Low incidence of snacks between meals.
- Avoidance of common American food items, such as soda, deep-fried foods, snack foods, and especially prepared foods that can typically make up a large percentage of the foods found in American grocery stores.

Clower tends to downplay the common beliefs that wine consumption and smoking are greatly responsible for the French paradox. While a higher percentage of French people smoke, this is not greatly higher than the U.S. (35% in France vs. 25% in U.S.) and is unlikely to account for the weight difference between countries.

==== Early life nutrition ====
One proposed explanation of the French paradox regards possible effects (epigenetic or otherwise) of dietary improvements in the first months and years of life, exerted across multiple generations. Following defeat in the Franco-Prussian War in 1871, the French government introduced an aggressive nutritional program providing high quality foods to pregnant women and young children with the aim of fortifying future generations of soldiers (the program was implemented about three decades prior to an analogous initiative in England in response to the Boer War). It has been suggested that the particular timing of this historical intervention might help explain the relatively low rates of obesity and heart disease found in France.

== See also ==
- French cuisine – Culinary tradition
- Israeli paradox – Paradox of high CHD incidence among Israeli Jews
- List of paradoxes – List of statements that appear to contradict themselves
- Mediterranean diet – Diet inspired by the Mediterranean region
- Mexican paradox – Paradox regarding low birth weight among Mexicans
- Saturated fat and cardiovascular disease – Fat in which the fatty acid chains have all or predominantly single bonds
- Stroke Belt – Region in the United States
- Health effects of wine – Potential health effects resulting from drinking wine
