= Stroke Belt =

Region in the United States

Map of states of the Stroke Belt

The Stroke Belt or Stroke Alley is a region in the southeastern United States that has been recognized by public health authorities for having an unusually high incidence of stroke and other forms of cardiovascular disease. It is usually defined as a 11-state region consisting of Alabama, Arkansas, Georgia, Indiana, Kentucky, Louisiana, Mississippi, North Carolina, South Carolina, Tennessee, and Virginia. It is often disputed if Texas and Florida belongs in the Stroke Belt.

== Geographic scope ==
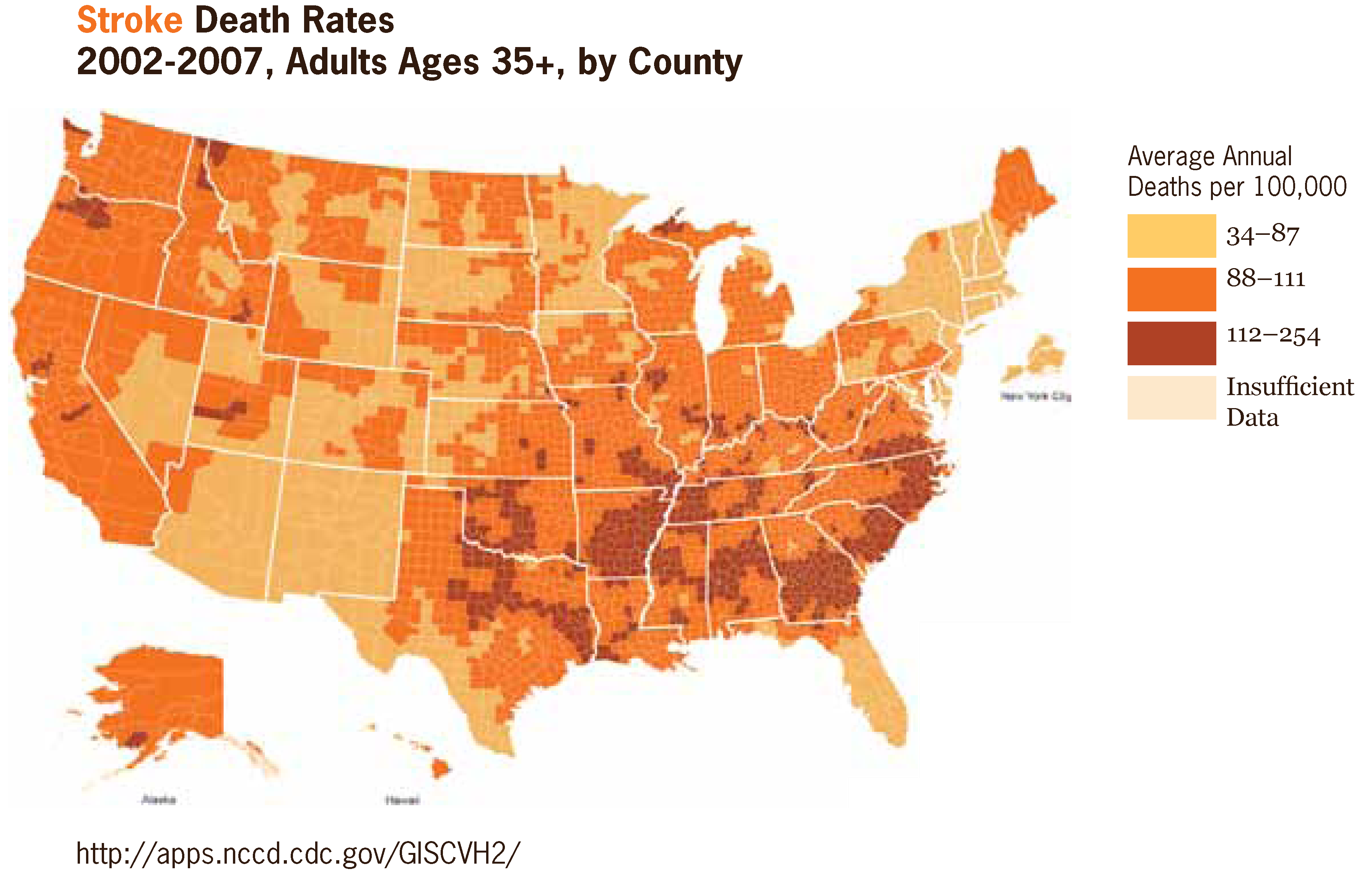
Stroke death rates (2002–2007), adults 35+ by U.S. county

The Stroke Belt is typically defined to include the states of Alabama, Arkansas, Georgia, Indiana, Kentucky, Louisiana, Mississippi, North Carolina, South Carolina, Tennessee, and Virginia. In 1980, these 11 states had age-adjusted stroke mortality rates more than 10% above the national average.

Some investigators also consider North Florida to be a part of the Stroke Belt, based on a stroke mortality rate higher than several states included in the region. East Texas is also characterized as part of the Stroke Belt.

== History of observations ==
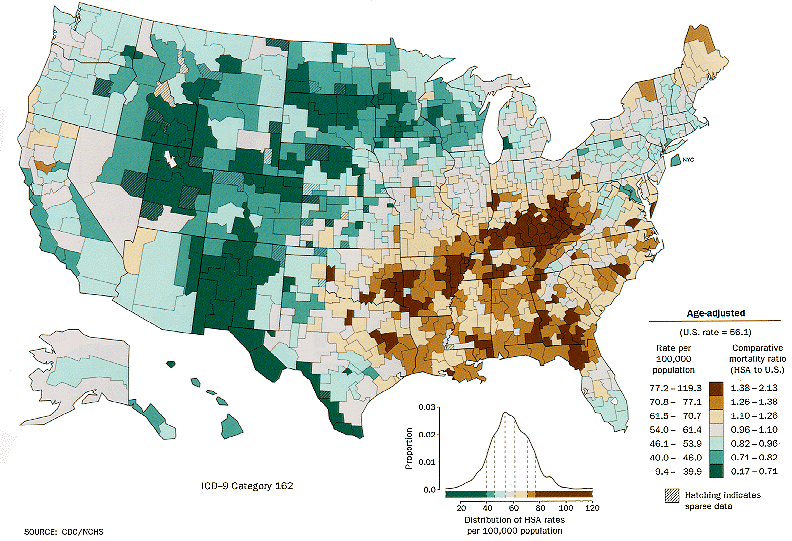
High rates of lung cancer (indicated in this map by brown colors) are highly correlated with the Stroke Belt.

The Stroke Belt was first identified in 1962 by Centers for Disease Control (CDC) researchers who noted a concentration of high stroke death rates in the Atlantic coastal plain counties of North Carolina, South Carolina, and Georgia. Similar high stroke rates were later observed in the Mississippi Delta region as well.

Analysis by the CDC of U.S. mortality statistics from 1991 to 1998 found that for both blacks and whites, counties with the highest stroke death rates were in the southeastern states and the Mississippi Delta region. Stroke death rates for states ranged from a high of 169 per 100,000 in South Carolina to a low of 89 per 100,000 in New York. While most observational studies have focused primarily on stroke incidence in adults, in 2004 researchers reported that children in the eleven Stroke Belt states also have an increased risk of death from ischemic and hemorrhagic stroke compared with children in other states.

Glymour et al. (2007) reported that adults who had resided in the Stroke Belt during childhood and had moved outside the region had higher stroke risk at ages 50 and older than adults who grew up in areas with lower stroke incidence. A study reported in 2011 found that people over age 45 living in the eight "stroke belt" states of Alabama, Arkansas, Georgia, Louisiana, Mississippi, North Carolina, South Carolina, and Tennessee had an 18 percent higher incidence of cognitive decline than people in other U.S. regions. Another researcher noted that, "Stroke by itself is a major contributor to cognitive impairment and dementia." Other researchers have made similar observations.

In 2011, CDC researchers mapped the occurrence of diabetes in the U.S. by county, finding that highest prevalence of diabetes is in a "diabetes belt" that has extensive overlap with the Stroke Belt.

== Hypotheses on causation ==
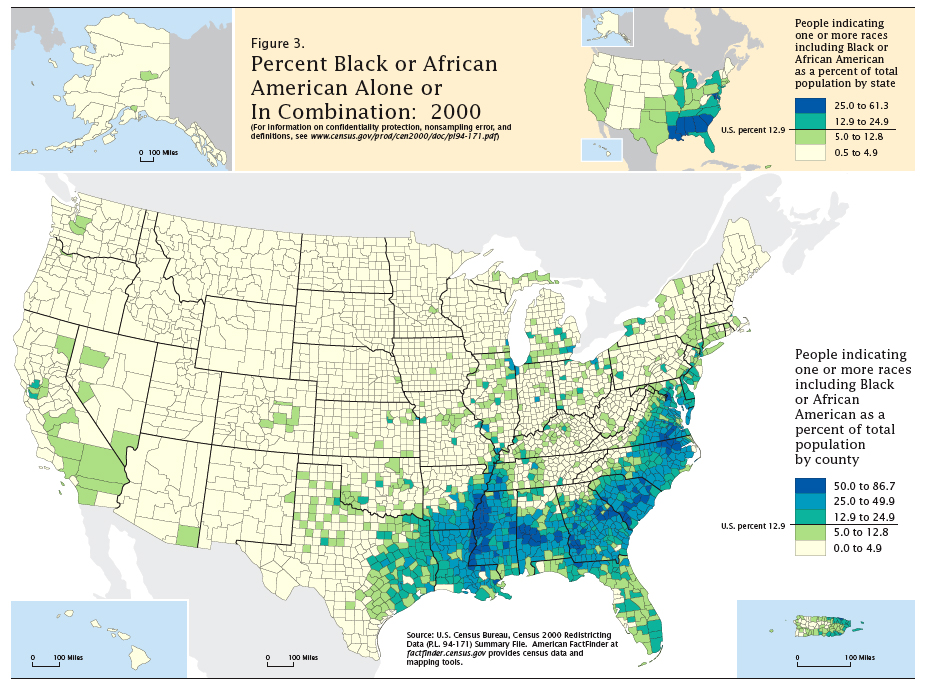
Black percentage of the population, 2000 U.S. census

The causes of the elevated incidence of stroke in the Stroke Belt region have not been determined. Numerous possible contributing factors have been identified, including hypertension, low socioeconomic status, diet, cultural lifestyle, quality of healthcare facilities, smoking, and infections. Among the specific factors that have been proposed or studied are the following:

- It has been suggested that the higher stroke death rates in the Stroke Belt are due to the region's high African American population, because African Americans' stroke death rates are higher than the national average. However, because white people also have higher rates of stroke death in the Stroke Belt than in other parts of the country, the higher death rates in the Stroke Belt cannot be attributed solely to the region's higher proportion of African Americans.
- In the early 1990s it was hypothesized that selenium deficiency in the soils of the coastal plain might be a causative factor. The subsequent recognition of high stroke incidence in areas with different soil characteristics led researchers to reject this hypothesis.
- Inflammation and infection can increase the risk of stroke in a variety of ways, such as by encouraging the process of atherosclerosis. Residents of the Stroke Belt have a higher incidence of sepsis than the general U.S. population, as well as higher levels of C-reactive protein, which is a sign of inflammation in the body.
- Some observers have assumed that more stroke belt residents suffer from untreated hypertension. However, researchers have found that residents of the southern United States are as likely to be aware of hypertension and receiving treatment as residents of other U.S. regions. Additionally, researchers who documented the region's elevated incidence of pediatric stroke noted that "If the stroke belt is solely caused by regional differences in atherosclerotic stroke risk factors, it should not apply to children."
- It has been suggested that one cause of higher mortality may be the predominantly rural character of the region, which increases the distances that patients must travel to obtain emergency medical treatment. Regional differences in standards of medical care have also been suggested as a contributing factor. In one study, researchers found that patients discharged from hospitals in the Stroke Belt after suffering acute myocardial infarction were less likely to be treated with warfarin than patients in most other U.S. regions.
- Glymour et al. (2007) suggested that the higher stroke incidence in the stroke belt is related to experiences or exposures in childhood.
- It has been proposed that poverty and malnutrition in previous generations, which resulted in poor maternal prenatal nutrition and low birth weights, led to a predisposition to cardiovascular disease in adult life.
- Diets high in fried and high-fat foods (such as fried chicken or fried fish), which are prevalent in the region, are thought to contribute to higher risk.
- The same geographical area also has a higher than national average incidence of lung cancer, as it is where much of the tobacco in the U.S. is grown. Smoking is reputed to be the strongest contributing factor of developing both diseases.

== Public health initiatives to reduce stroke incidence in the region ==
The U.S. federal government has conducted public health programs specifically aimed at reducing stroke incidence and mortality in the Stroke Belt. In the 1990s the Stroke Belt Initiative operated in eleven Stroke Belt states, providing nutrition education, blood pressure screening, smoking cessation programs, weight loss programs, and other health promotion and public education initiatives targeted at stroke risk factors.

In 2004, the Stroke Belt Elimination Initiative of the U.S. Department of Health and Human Services awarded grants aimed at reducing the high incidence of stroke and high rates of stroke death and disability in the seven states with the highest rates of stroke (Alabama, Arkansas, Georgia, Mississippi, North Carolina, South Carolina, and Tennessee).

== Origins ==
The term "Stroke Belt" is modeled after similar terms used for U.S. regions such as "snowbelt" and "Sun Belt", which extend the analogy to the belt as an article of clothing. The coastal plain counties of the Carolinas and Georgia — where the stroke belt phenomenon was first described, and where stroke incidence is highest — are sometimes called the "buckle of the stroke belt" or the "stroke buckle".

== See also ==
- Banana belt
- French paradox
