= Get-rich-quick scheme =

Scam that promises high rates of return for a small investment

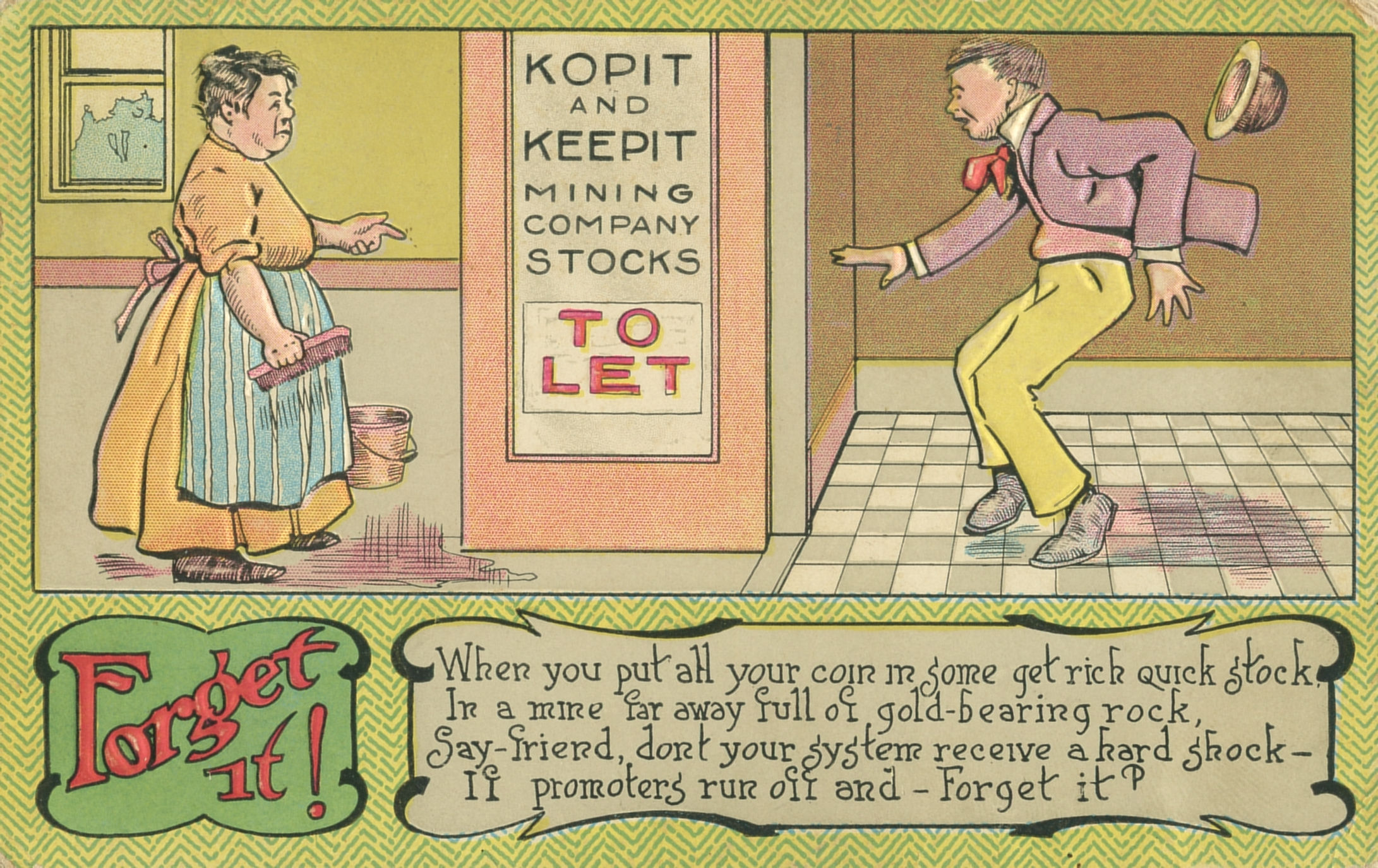
A 1910 postcard showing an investor's shock at "Kopit and Keepit Mining Company Stocks" having vacated their premises

A get-rich-quick scheme is a plan to obtain high rates of return for a small investment. Most schemes create an impression that participants can obtain this high rate of return with little risk, skill, effort, or time.

The term "get rich quick" has been used to describe shady investments since at least the early 20th century.

Get-rich-quick schemes often assert that wealth can be obtained by working at home. Get-rich-quick schemes that operate entirely on the Internet usually promote "secret formulas" to affiliate marketing and affiliate advertising. The scheme will usually claim that it does not require any special IT or marketing skills and will provide an unrealistic timeframe in which the individual could make hundreds of thousands, if not millions of dollars. Since the growth in popularity of non-fungible tokens (NFTs) in the early 2020s, skeptics have accused many NFT projects of resembling get-rich-quick schemes. Modern get-rich-quick schemes involve practices such as selling courses or mentorships for several niches often labelled as "side hustles", advertised on short-form platforms like TikTok or Instagram reels.

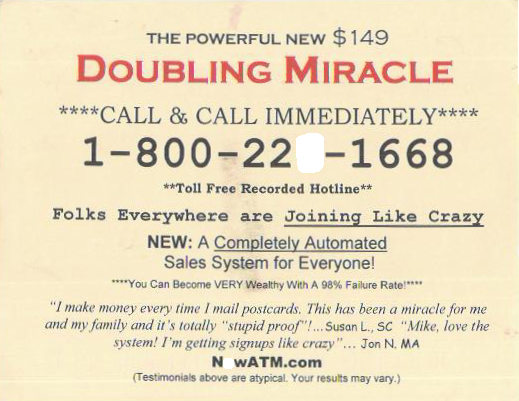
2007 unsolicited mail flyer advertising a get-rich-quick scheme

Legal and quasi-legal get-rich-quick schemes are frequently advertised on infomercials and in magazines and newspapers. Illegal schemes or scams are often advertised through spam or cold calling. Some forms of advertising for these schemes market books or compact discs about getting rich quick rather than asking participants to invest directly in a concrete scheme.

== See also ==
- Advance-fee scam
- Envelope stuffing
- Ripoff
- HYIP
- No such thing as a free lunch
- Land banking
- The Secret

== Bibliography ==
- Leila Schneps and Coralie Colmez, Math on trial. How numbers get used and abused in the courtroom, Basic Books, 2013. ISBN 978-0-465-03292-1. (Eighth chapter: "Math error number 8: underestimation. The case of Charles Ponzi: American dream, American scheme").
