= Colmez =

Colmez is a French surname. Notable individuals with this surname include:

- Pierre Colmez (born 1962), French mathematician
- Coralie Colmez, French mathematician and author (daughter of Pierre Colmez)
