= Lucia de Berk case =

Dutch miscarriage of justice case

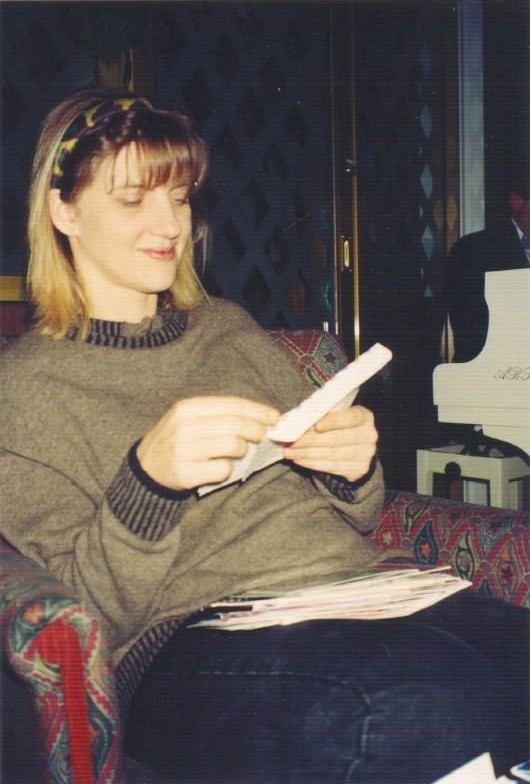
De Berk prior to her imprisonment

The Lucia de Berk case was a miscarriage of justice in the Netherlands in which a Dutch licensed paediatric nurse was wrongfully convicted of murder. In 2003, Lucia de Berk (22 September 1961 – 28 August 2025) was sentenced to life imprisonment, for which no parole is possible under Dutch law, for four murders and three attempted murders of patients under her care. In 2004, after an appeal, she was convicted of seven murders and three attempted murders.

Her conviction was controversial in the media and among scientists, and it was questioned by the investigative reporter Peter R. de Vries. Most prominently, the prosecution's case rested on statistical misrepresentation. In October 2008, the case was reopened by the Dutch Supreme Court, as new facts had been uncovered that undermined the previous verdicts. De Berk was freed, and her case retried; she was exonerated in April 2010.

She died on 28 August 2025, aged 63, following a short illness.

== Suspicions and investigation ==
Colleagues started to notice that patients often died under De Berk's watch. Suspicions were raised when a five-month-old baby turned blue and died unexpectedly, only an hour after doctors had said that her condition was improving. Other colleagues requested an investigation. A post-mortem on the child indicated foul play.

Police investigators looked into all the deaths that had occurred between 1997 and 2001 while De Berk was working at three hospitals in The Hague: the Juliana Children's Hospital, the Red Cross Hospital, and the Leyenburg Hospital. In a few cases, evidence of poisoning through tranquilizer overdose was found, although in most cases no firm explanations could be found for the deaths.

Lucia de Berk was charged with killing thirteen patients and attempting to kill five others by injecting them with tranquilizers, painkillers and potassium. The alleged victims included four babies, several toddlers and some elderly persons.

== Trial ==
De Berk's trial began in September 2002. Amongst the other evidence used against her were diary entries that the prosecution asserted showed that she was "obsessed by death". It was revealed that she had tried to burn these diaries to destroy them at the start of the investigation. A toxicologist, an FBI profiler and a statistician were also called by the prosecution as evidence. Another key piece of the evidence was traces of poisonous toxins found in the blood of three children she had been alleged to have killed, who had been exhumed as part of the investigation. Tests on the body of the five-month-old baby whose death had led to the initial suspicions of De Berk indicated that the baby had been poisoned. It was also noted that police had found books about crimes and murders in her home, such as Bad Blood: the Thanatos Syndrome Serial Murderer and Corpus Delicti: the 30 Most Notorious Crimes of the Low Countries. The prosecution also highlighted the fact that she had forged a Canadian diploma in order to qualify for medical training, and De Berk also faced further charges for this falsification of records and the book thefts. De Berk admitted during the trial that she had lied about her nursing credentials and had stolen the books as well as medicine and patient files.

The prosecution argued that she had killed or attempted to kill patients by unnecessarily increasing dosages of medicines, or giving large doses of drugs that are difficult to detect. One of the trial judges noted that the cases in question seemed to follow a particular pattern, saying: "Lucia says she believes she sees a problem and starts to alert colleagues and soon enough a crisis occurs, did you perhaps raise the alarm first so that you could then introduce death?".

De Berk denied the charges, blaming the deaths and near-deaths on other staff in the hospitals or the quality of medical equipment. She said that the diary entries had been misinterpreted and taken out of context, and that the "compulsion" she had said she had given in to was actually her love for laying out Tarot cards for ill patients. One of the victims, a six-year-old Afghan boy, had died from a lethal dose of a sleeping medication; De Berk testified to the court "of course it's strange, but I don't know how it happened". Her defence argued that she was only more often present at deaths because she had a lot of concern for her patients.

During the trial, proceedings were adjourned as De Berk was sent by the court for psychiatric tests at the Netherlands forensic psychiatric assessment centre, where she was found to have a personality disorder but to be completely responsible for her actions. De Berk had previously refused requests to undergo psychiatric tests. When a psychologist testified at the trial that De Berk was "theatrical, narcissistic, aggressive and suffering from a personality disorder", de Berk replied: "that sounds like me".

In March 2003, De Berk was found guilty of the murder of four of the individuals and the attempted murder of three others. In every one of the cases De Berk was responsible for their care and medication, or was the last person present before they died or declined. Of those that died it was concluded that they had been given an overdose of either potassium or morphine, and in each of the cases De Berk was the last person to be at the patients' bedside. In all seven cases where she was found guilty there was no possible medical explanation.

In two cases, the court concluded that there was proof that De Berk had poisoned the patients. Concerning the other cases the judges considered that they could not be explained medically and must have been caused by De Berk, who was present on all of those occasions. The idea that only weaker evidence was needed for the subsequent murders after two had been proven beyond reasonable doubt, dubbed chain-link proof by the prosecution, was accepted by the court.

The very high digoxin levels in autopsy blood from one child were key to the argument. Digoxin had previously been administered to the child, but the treatment had been discontinued some time before and doctors argued there should be none remaining. There was a brief period when the child had been disconnected from monitors approximately an hour before death, which would have been the time when a lethal overdose of the drug would have needed to be administered. This, the prosecution argued, gave means and opportunity to murder the child.

De Berk was jailed for life. Her lawyer quickly said that she would appeal, claiming that her conviction had been based only on circumstantial evidence. The media reported her diary entries as being the key evidence in her conviction.

== Further convictions and appeals ==
In 2004, De Berk's first appeal failed when the Court of Appeal upheld her conviction, and then convicted her of three additional murders. At the 2004 trial, besides a life sentence, De Berk also received detention with coerced psychiatric treatment, despite the state criminal psychological observation unit finding no evidence of mental illness. A second appeal also failed when the Dutch Supreme Court upheld her conviction in 2006.

== Doubts ==
One of the various pieces of evidence against De Berk at the original trial had been the testimony of a statistician, who said that the odds that it was a coincidence that all the incidents occurred when she was on duty were 342 million to one. Doubts were raised about De Berk's conviction when this claim was criticised. However, the appeals court still upheld the conviction on this and the other evidence.

The philosopher of science Ton Derksen, aided by his sister, the geriatrician Metta de Noo-Derksen, wrote the Dutch book Lucia de B. Reconstructie van een gerechtelijke dwaling (Lucia de B: Reconstruction of a Miscarriage of Justice). They doubted the reasoning that was used by the court and the medical and statistical evidence that was presented.

The prosecution initially charged De Berk with causing 13 deaths or medical emergencies. In court, the defence showed that De Berk could not have been involved at all in several of the cases. For instance, she had been away for several days, but administrative errors had caused her absence on those days to be overlooked. Also, all the deaths except the last had been registered as natural. Even that one had initially been thought to be natural by the doctors responsible for the child, but had been reclassified as an unnatural death within a day after other hospital authorities associated it with De Berk and her repeated presence at recent incidents.

=== Statistical arguments ===
Hospital and ward	Juliana Children's Hospital	Red Cross Hospital, ward 41	Red Cross Hospital, ward 42
Total shifts	1,029	336	339
De Berk's shifts	142	1 *	58
Incidents	8	5	14
Incidents during De Berk's shift(s)	8	1	5
- Statistics in report presented at trial * Later found to be 3

In a 2003 television special of NOVA, a Dutch professor of criminal law, Theo de Roos, stated, "In the Lucia de B. case statistical evidence has been of enormous importance. I do not see how one could have come to a conviction without it".

Statistician Richard D. Gill became involved in the case in 2006. Gill and Piet Groeneboom then showed that there was a chance of 1 in 25 that a nurse could experience a sequence of events of the same type as De Berk. Philip Dawid, Professor of Statistics at the University of Cambridge, also criticised the prosecution's statistical evidence as unprofessional and resting on "calculations of a very simplistic nature, based on very simple and unrealistic assumptions".

The use of probability arguments in the De Berk case was discussed in a 2007 Nature article by Mark Buchanan. He wrote:

The court needs to weigh up two different explanations: murder or coincidence. The argument that the deaths were unlikely to have occurred by chance (whether 1 in 48 or 1 in 342 million) is not that meaningful on its own—for instance, the probability that ten murders would occur in the same hospital might be even more unlikely. What matters is the relative likelihood of the two explanations. However, the court was given an estimate for only the first scenario.

In addition to errors in the analysis, concerns were raised about the data provided by one of the hospitals, which appeared to show that De Berk was present at every single significant incident where reanimation (successful or not) was required. As a certain number of such cases are expected in all hospitals, there was reason to doubt the data provided, and later analysis after De Berk's acquittal showed that indeed, not all incidents were reported, and some cases attributed to her occurred when she was not present, had already left or was absent due to illness.

At the initiative of Gill, a petition for a reopening of the De Berk case was started. On 2 November 2007, the signatures were presented to the Minister of Justice, Ernst Hirsch Ballin, and the State Secretary of Justice, Nebahat Albayrak. Over 1300 people signed the petition.

== Case reopened ==
On 17 June 2008, the Advocate-General of the Supreme Court, G. Knigge, made a request for the Supreme Court to reopen the case. On 7 October 2008, the court acceded to his request by acknowledging that new facts uncovered by Knigge substantially undermined the earlier evidence.

In addition to the statistical arguments, at the third appeal hearing doubt was cast on the evidence about high digoxin levels in one child's blood, which had played a major role in De Berk's second conviction and life sentence for murder at the 2004 appeal hearings. Digoxin levels in autopsy blood should be expected to be much higher than those in a living patient. Living heart cells extract digoxin from the blood and concentrate it, but heart cells die within minutes after death and so digoxin can then diffuse into the blood in the heart and in the surrounding large blood vessels, the sites from which blood is extracted by pathologists for blood chemistry analysis. Additionally, the blood taken from the child for analysis did not originate from a proper sample but was squeezed out of a piece of gauze left inside the body after two autopsies had disturbed all of the organs. Digoxin levels increase with the evaporation of liquid. The measurement of digoxin was also complicated by the presence of digoxin-like immunoreactive substances (DLIS), which occur naturally particularly in infants. The tests used to determine the presence of digoxin were not able to distinguish between digoxin and DLIS. A laboratory in Strasbourg, with the facility to distinguish between digoxin and DLIS, analysed the samples and found 7 milligrams of digoxin per litre, a level below the threshold that would indicate poisoning. Other medical findings also failed to show any evidence of poisoning, such as the non-contraction of the heart.

It was also shown that the evidence of opportunity to poison the child with digoxin was flawed. The monitor had been disconnected at 1:20 for 28 minutes, but a doctor's examination was recorded at 1:00. Analysis of the log sheet of examinations showed that they were always recorded on the hour or the half hour. A reconstruction of events showed that the disconnection would therefore have been for the examination itself, logged at 1:00 but taking place shortly after the hour. Digoxin kills within an hour, and so would have needed to be administered during that examination.

In December 2009, with new statistical analysis and medical evidence having been presented, the court accepted that the deaths had all been entirely natural. The appeal hearing ended on 17 March 2010. Witnesses heard on the final day stated that the deaths at the Juliana Children's Hospital were natural and were sometimes caused by wrong treatment or bad hospital management and sometimes resulted from faulty medical diagnosis. The behaviour of the nurses, including De Berk, during a couple of medical crises turned out to have been swift and effective and to have saved lives on several occasions. The Public Prosecution capitulated by formally requesting the court to deliver a not guilty verdict, which occurred on 14 April 2010.

== Legacy ==
De Berk's case has become a prominent example of the prosecutor's fallacy and general misuse of statistical evidence in murder trials, particularly of medical professionals. Sceptics of the British nurse Lucy Letby's murder convictions have cited the De Berk case as precedent, suggesting that the Crown Prosecution Service employed the same fallacious statistical methods against Letby as were used in De Berk's trial.

== See also ==
- Miscarriages of justice in the Netherlands
- Sally Clark
- Prosecutor's fallacy
- Accused (2014 film), a 2014 Dutch film

== Sources ==
- Buchanan, Mark. "Statistics: Conviction by numbers." Nature. 445, 254-255 (18 January 2007) | doi:10.1038/445254a; Published online 17 January 2007
- Leila Schneps and Coralie Colmez, Math on trial. How numbers get used and abused in the courtroom, Basic Books, 2013. ISBN 978-0-465-03292-1. (Seventh chapter: "Math error number 7: the incredible coincidence. The case of Lucia de Berk: carer or killer?").
