= People v. Collins =

California case law overturning a verdict for abuse of the prosecutor's fallacy

- Supreme Court of California

Decided March 11, 1968
- Full case name: The People, Plaintiff and Respondent, v. Malcolm Ricardo Collins, Defendant and Appellant.
- Citation(s): 68 Cal. 2d 319

Holding
- A defendant's guilt must be determined by facts of the case; they cannot be determined by mathematical means, such as statistical probability. Judgement reversed.

Court membership
- Chief Justice: Roger J. Traynor
- Associate Justices: Marshall F. McComb, Raymond E. Peters, Mathew Tobriner, Stanley Mosk, Louis H. Burke, Raymond L. Sullivan

Case opinions
- Majority: Sullivan, joined by Traynor, Peters, Tobriner, Mosk, Burke
- Dissent: McComb

People v. Collins was a 1968 American robbery trial in California noted for its misuse of probability and as an example of the prosecutor's fallacy.

== Trial ==
After a mathematics instructor testified about the multiplication rule for probability, though ignoring conditional probability, the prosecutor invited the jury to consider the probability that the accused (who fit a witness's description of a black male with a beard and mustache and a Caucasian female with a blond ponytail, fleeing in a yellow car) were not the robbers, suggesting that they estimated the probabilities as:

Black man with beard	1 in 10
Man with mustache	1 in 4
White woman with pony tail	1 in 10
White woman with blond hair	1 in 3
Yellow motor car	1 in 10
Interracial couple in car	1 in 1,000

The jury returned a guilty verdict.

== Appeal ==
The California Supreme Court set aside the conviction, criticizing the statistical reasoning for ignoring dependencies between the characteristics, e.g., bearded men commonly sport mustaches, and for drawing an incorrect statistical inference. This mistaken inference, commonly called the prosecutor's fallacy, incorrectly equates the probability that a random defendant has a specific combination of traits with the chance that the defendant is innocent.

The Court said of the fallacy "we think that the entire enterprise upon which the prosecution embarked, and which was directed to the objective of measuring the likelihood of a random couple possessing the characteristics allegedly distinguishing the robbers, was gravely misguided. At best, it might yield an estimate as to how infrequently bearded Negroes drive yellow cars in the company of blonde females with ponytails."

The court noted that the correct statistical inference would be the probability that no other couple who could have committed the robbery had the same traits as the defendants given that at least one couple had the identified traits. The court noted, in an appendix to its decision, that using this correct statistical inference, even if the prosecutor's statistics were all correct and independent as he assumed, the probability that the defendants were innocent would be over 40%.

The court asserted that mathematics, "...while assisting the trier of fact in the search of truth, must not cast a spell over him." In particular, the court expressed its concern that complex mathematics would distract the jury from weighing the credibility of witnesses and the reasonableness of their doubts. The court also expressed concern that if mathematics became common tools for prosecutors that there would not be enough defense attorneys skilled at mathematics to put on a skilled defense.

== See also ==
- Howland will forgery trial

== Bibliography ==
- Schneps, Leila; Colmez, Coralie (2013). "Math error number 2: unjustified estimates. The case of Janet Collins: hairstyle probability". Math on trial: how numbers get used and abused in the courtroom. New York: Basic Books. ISBN 978-0-465-03292-1. OCLC 808421296.
