= Howland will forgery trial =

1868 U.S. court case

The Howland will forgery trial (Robinson v. Mandell) was a U.S. court case in 1868 where businesswoman Henrietta "Hetty" Howland Robinson, who would later become the richest woman in America, contested the validity of the will of her grandaunt, Sylvia Ann Howland.

According to Sylvia Howland's will, half of her $2 million estate (equivalent to $42,000,000 in 2025) would go to various charities and entities, the rest would be in a trust for Hetty Robinson. Robinson challenged the will's validity by producing an earlier will that left the entire estate to her, and which included a clause invalidating any subsequent wills. The case was ultimately decided against Robinson after the court ruled that the clause invalidating future wills and Sylvia's signature to it were forgeries.

It is famous for the forensic use of mathematics by Benjamin Peirce as an expert witness.

== History ==
Sylvia Ann Howland died in 1865, leaving roughly half her fortune of some 2 million dollars to various legatees, with the residue to be held in trust for the benefit of Robinson, Howland's niece. The remaining principal was to be distributed to various beneficiaries on Robinson's death.

Robinson produced an earlier will, leaving her the whole estate outright. To the will was attached a second and separate page, putatively seeking to invalidate any subsequent wills. Howland's executor, Thomas Mandell, rejected Robinson's claim, insisting that the second page was a forgery, and Robinson sued.

In the ensuing case of Robinson v. Mandell, Charles Sanders Peirce testified that he had made pairwise comparisons of 42 examples of Howland's signature, overlaying them and counting the number of downstrokes that overlapped. Each signature featured 30 downstrokes and he concluded that, on average, 6 of the 30 overlapped, 1 in 5. Benjamin Peirce, Charles' father, showed that the number of overlapping downstrokes between two signatures also closely followed the binomial distribution, the expected distribution if each downstroke was an independent event. When the admittedly genuine signature on the first page of the contested will was compared with that on the second, all 30 downstrokes coincided, suggesting that the second signature was a tracing of the first.

Benjamin Peirce then took the stand and asserted that, given the independence of each downstroke, the probability that all 30 downstrokes should coincide in two genuine signatures was $\textstyle\frac{1}{2.666 \times 10^{21}}$. That is one in 2,666,000,000,000,000,000,000, in the order of magnitude of sextillions. He went on to observe:

So vast improbability is practically an impossibility. Such evanescent shadows of probability cannot belong to actual life. They are unimaginably less than those least things which the law cares not for. ... The coincidence which has occurred here must have had its origin in an intention to produce it. It is utterly repugnant to sound reason to attribute this coincidence to any cause but design.

The court ruled that Robinson's testimony in support of Howland's signature was inadmissible as she was a party to the will, thus having a conflict of interest. The statistical evidence was not called upon in judgment.

The case is one of a series of attempts to introduce mathematical reasoning into the courts. People v. Collins is a more recent example.

== General bibliography ==
- Eggleston, Richard (1983). Evidence, Proof and Probability, ISBN 0-297-78263-0
- Robinson v. Mandell, 20 F. Cas. 1027 (C.C.D. Mass. 1868). (No. 11,959)
- Menand, Louis (2001). The Metaphysical Club: A Story of Ideas in America. New York: Farrar, Straus, and Giroux. pp. 163–176. ISBN 0374199639.
- Meier, P. & Zabell, S. (1980). "Benjamin Peirce and the Howland Will", Journal of the American Statistical Association, vol. 75, p. 497
- "The Howland Will Case", American Law Review, vol. 4, p. 625 (1870)
- Leila Schneps and Coralie Colmez, Math on trial: How numbers get used and abused in the courtroom, Basic Books, 2013. ISBN 978-0-465-03292-1. (Ninth chapter: "Math error number 9: choosing a wrong model. The case of Hetty Green: a battle of wills").
