= Math on Trial =

Book about courtroom mathematics

Math on Trial: How Numbers Get Used and Abused in the Courtroom is a book on mathematical and statistical reasoning in legal argumentation, for a popular audience. It was written by American mathematician Leila Schneps and her daughter, French mathematics educator Coralie Colmez, and published in 2013 by Basic Books.

== Topics ==
Math on Trial consists of ten chapters, each outlining a particular mathematical fallacy, presenting a case study of a trial in which it arose, and then detailing the effects of the fallacy on the case outcome The cases range over a wide range of years and locations, and are roughly ordered by the sophistication of the reasoning needed to resolve them. Their descriptions are based on case records, contemporary newspaper accounts, later scholarship, and in some cases interviews with the principals. In particular:

- Chapter 1 involves the incorrect assumption that related events have independent probabilities of occurring, a recurring theme in several other cases presented in later chapters. It illustrates this through Sally Clark, an English mother who was convicted of murdering her two infants, both of whom died suddenly soon after their birth. The case involved the testimony of pediatrician Roy Meadow, who testified that the probability of this occurring naturally was one in 73 million, based on an incorrect calculation in which he used the assumption of independence and squared the probability of a single sudden crib death. A second fallacy, also present in the case, is the assumption that an unlikely event cannot happen, when in fact many unlikely events (such as that some particular person wins a lottery) happen routinely.
- Chapter 2 concerns another case of the false assumption of independence, used in the case of People v. Collins to argue that a certain combination of physical features used to identify a suspect was so exceedingly rare that only the defendants could have matched them.
- Chapter 3 involves the Joe E. Sneed murder trial, in which mathematician and gambling expert Edward O. Thorp participated.
- In Chapter 4, the book covers the case of Amanda Knox, an American student in Italy wrongfully convicted for the murder of her housemate.
- Chapter 5 involves the birthday paradox and its application to DNA profiling. In the case it details, the murder of Diana Sylvester, a defendant who had been implicated by DNA evidence argued that the existence of pairs of people with matching DNA in small collections of samples invalidated that evidence. The fallacy arose in applying a statistic over all pairs of samples (to which the birthday paradox applies) to a situation where one is instead comparing the samples to a single data point, the DNA found at the crime scene (to which it does not apply).
- Chapter 6 concerns Simpson's paradox, the phenomenon in which a statistical trend may exist in several groups of data points but disappear when the groups are combined, or vice versa. Its case study is an investigation into possible gender bias in student admission at the University of California, Berkeley in the 1970s, in which the admission statistics for six separate departments showed a small bias in favor of women in admissions, and yet when grouped together into a single set the same statistics seemed to show a larger bias against women. A closer examination of the data explained that the lower overall admission rate for women was not because of discrimination by any department, but rather because the female applicants aimed higher, to the departments whose overall admission rates were low. The same chapter also brings in a later case of alleged anti-women bias at Berkeley, the lawsuit over the tenure denial of mathematician Jenny Harrison.
- The case from Chapter 7 is that of Lucia de Berk, a Dutch nurse wrongfully convicted of murdering or attempting to murder seven patients, based on statistical calculations purporting to show that it was otherwise unlikely for her to have been present at all seven incidents.
- Chapter 8 discusses exponential growth and Ponzi schemes, highlighting the cases of Charles Ponzi and Bernie Madoff, and suggesting that the promises they made of unending exponential growth should have been a red flag to their duped investors.
- The case discussed in Chapter 9, the Howland will forgery trial, involved a disputed will. Benjamin Peirce developed a statistical model of similarity for handwritten signatures, arguing that the signature on the will was too exact a match of the same signature on another document and therefore that it was likely to be a forgery. However, although Peirce's model was later determined to be a bad fit for the particulars of this case, the eventual decision sidestepped the issue leaving Peirce's reasoning unused.
- In chapter 10, the book takes on the Dreyfus affair, in which French army officer Alfred Dreyfus was convicted of espionage, based in part on an elaborately concocted statistical analysis of his handwriting. Mathematician Henri Poincaré played a part in Dreyfus's eventual exoneration.

A final conclusion section sums up the cases and brings their histories up to date. Beyond legal practice, the authors argue that the fallacies present in the cases they describe are representative of those appearing more broadly in the public sphere.

== Audience and reception ==
Although some familiarity with basic probability would be helpful to readers, the book is intended for a broad audience, and reviewer Ray Hill writes that its authors "have struck the right balance of providing enough mathematics for the specialist to check out the details, but not so much as to overwhelm the general reader". Hill recommends the book, writing that it "is packed with interest and drama". Similarly, Daniel Ullman writes that it is "beautifully written", with powerful storytelling and careful research. Ludwig Paditz write that it "vividly shows how the desire for scientific certainty can lead even well-meaning courts to commit grave injustice". Paul H. Edelman singles out the wide range of times and places of the cases presented as a particular strength of the book.

Several reviewers suggest that, beyond a general audience, the book may also be useful as supplementary material for students of probability and statistics, although reviewer Chris Stapel warns that it often overemphasizes the significance of mathematics in the legal cases presented. As reviewer Iwan Praton writes, in many of these cases, the correct reasoning was also presented, but "it is not enough to be correct—one has to be persuasive, too".

However, as well as these positive reviews, the book attracted a significant amount of criticism from its reviewers. Noah Giansiracusa complains that the authors sometimes perpetrate the same fallacies or mistaken calculations that they warn of, that their treatment of legal reasoning can be superficial, and that their accounts of some cases appear to exhibit bias by the authors instead of presenting the cases neutrally.

Daniel Ullman also outlines several miscalculations by the authors, while pointing out that they do not affect the overall story told by the book. Michael Finkelstein, a lawyer and scholar of legal statistics, points out an error of fact in Chapter 9 (the book discusses the jury's opinion in a case that had no jury), citing it as evidence of its tendency to aggrandize the role of mathematics in these cases. He suggests instead that in practice, convincing courts of cases through statistical arguments is very difficult and that the fallacies described in these cases are unrepresentative of modern jurisprudence. Edelman criticizes the book for multiple instances of jumps in reasoning, from the mathematical evidence presented in cases and the outcome in cases to dubious conclusions about the significance of the mathematics to the outcome.

Both Edelman and Ullman strongly disagree with the authors' conclusion that mathematics has been a disastrous force in the law. Edelman argues that the problems of fallacious mathematical arguments in legal cases are not different in nature from those of any other expert testimony, and would better be addressed by improving the training of judges in the general use of expert evidence than in the quixotic goal of increasing the mathematical literacy of prospective jurors. Ullman, instead, sees danger in the book's warning against the use of statistical arguments in legal cases, writing that "it is critically important to permit sound mathematics and science to inform legal proceedings".
