= Cancer staging =

Process of determining the extent of cancer spread

- Purpose: Determining the extent to which a cancer has developed

Cancer staging is the process of determining the extent to which a cancer has grown and spread. A number from I to IV is assigned, with I being an isolated cancer and IV being a cancer that has metastasized and spread from its origin. The stage generally takes into account the size of a tumor, whether it has invaded adjacent organs, how many regional (nearby) lymph nodes it has spread to (if any), and whether it has appeared in more distant locations (metastasized).

== TNM staging system ==
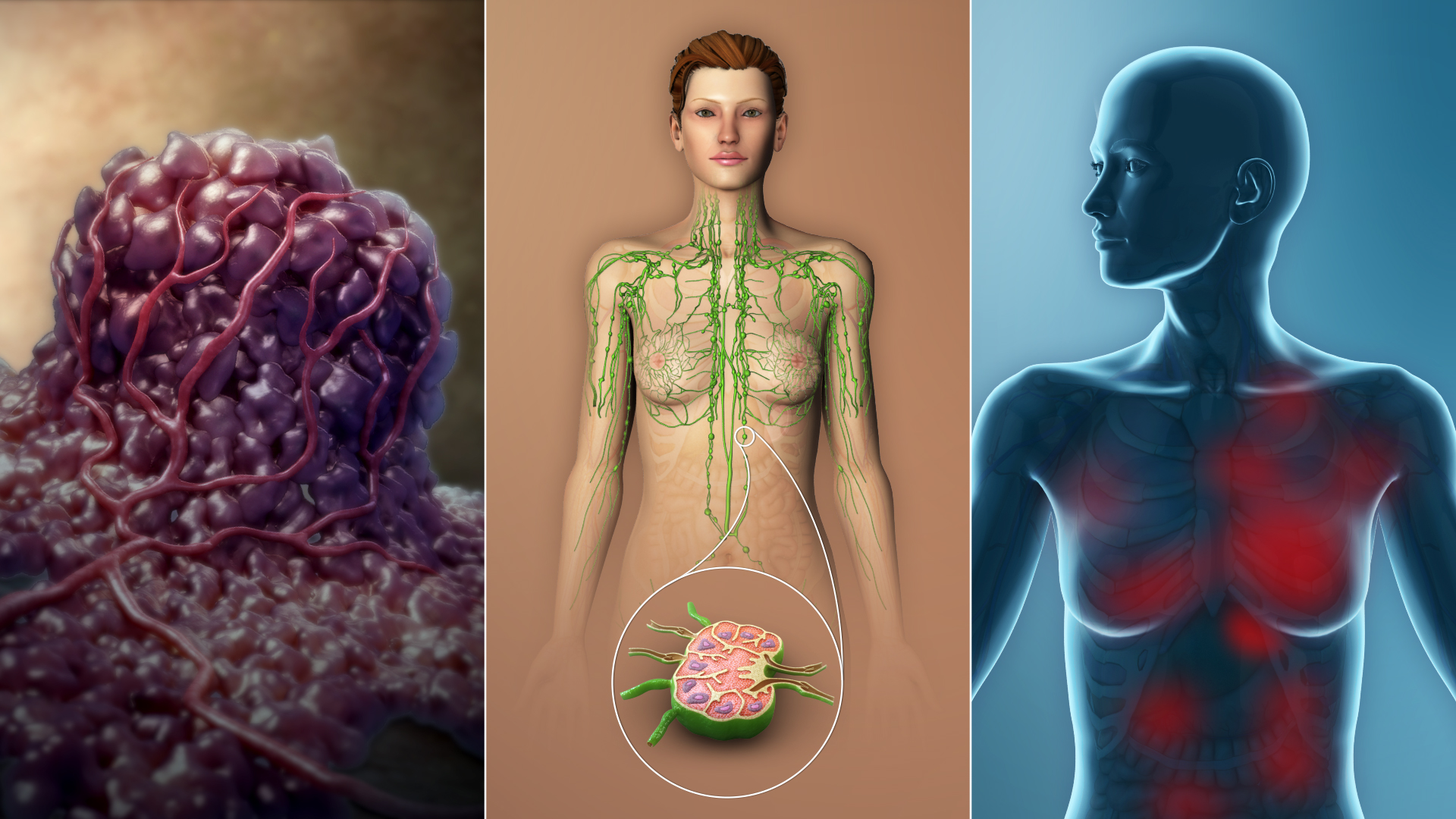
3D medical illustration depicting the TNM stages in breast cancer

Cancer staging can be divided into a clinical stage and a pathologic stage. In the TNM (Tumor, Node, Metastasis) system, clinical stage and pathologic stage are denoted by a small "c" or "p" before the stage (e.g., cT3N1M0 or pT2N0). This staging system is used for most forms of cancer, except brain tumors and hematological malignancies.

- Clinical stage is based on all of the available information obtained before a surgery to remove the tumor. This stage may include information about the tumor obtained by physical examination, blood tests, radiologic examination, biopsy, and endoscopy.
- Pathologic stage adds additional information gained by examination of the tumor microscopically by a pathologist after it has been surgically removed.

Because they use different criteria, clinical stage and pathologic stage often differ. Pathologic staging is usually considered to be more accurate because it allows direct examination of the tumor in its entirety, contrasted with clinical staging which is limited by the fact that the information is obtained by making indirect observations of a tumor which is still in the body. However, clinical staging and pathologic staging often complement each other. Not every tumor is treated surgically, so pathologic staging is not always available. Also, sometimes surgery is preceded by other treatments such as chemotherapy and radiation therapy which shrink the tumor, so the pathologic stage may underestimate the true stage.

== Considerations ==
Correct staging is critical because treatment (particularly the need for pre-operative therapy and/or for adjuvant treatment, the extent of surgery) is generally based on this parameter. Thus, incorrect staging would lead to improper treatment.

For some common cancers the staging process is well-defined. For example, in the cases of breast cancer and prostate cancer, doctors routinely can identify that the cancer is early and that it has low risk of metastasis. In such cases, medical specialty professional organizations recommend against the use of PET scans, CT scans, or bone scans because research shows that the risk of getting such procedures outweighs the possible benefits. Some of the problems associated with overtesting include patients receiving invasive procedures, overutilizing medical services, getting unnecessary radiation exposure, and experiencing misdiagnosis.

=== Pathologic ===
Pathologic staging, where a pathologist examines sections of tissue, can be particularly problematic for two specific reasons: visual discretion and random sampling of tissue. "Visual discretion" means being able to identify single cancerous cells intermixed with healthy cells on a slide. Oversight of one cell can mean misstaging and lead to serious, unexpected spread of cancer. "Random sampling" refers to the fact that lymph nodes are cherry-picked from patients and random samples are examined. If cancerous cells present in the lymph node happen not to be present in the slices of tissue viewed, incorrect staging and improper treatment can result.

== Systems ==
Staging systems are specific for each type of cancer (e.g., breast cancer and lung cancer), but some cancers do not have a staging system. Although competing staging systems still exist for some types of cancer, the universally-accepted staging system is that of the UICC, which has the same definitions of individual categories as the AJCC.

Systems of staging may differ between diseases or specific manifestations of a disease.

=== Blood ===
- Lymphoma: most use Ann Arbor staging
- Hodgkin lymphoma: follows a scale from I to IV and can be indicated further by an A or B, depending on whether a patient is non-symptomatic or has symptoms such as fevers. It is known as the "Cotswold System" or "Modified Ann Arbor Staging System".

=== Solid ===
For solid tumors, TNM is by far the most commonly used system, but it has been adapted for some conditions.

- Brain cancer: For most brain cancers, no staging systems are available and they are instead graded. Embryonal CNS tumors like medulloblastoma are staged following a classification developed by Chang et al.
- Breast cancer: In breast cancer classification, staging is usually based on TNM, but staging in I–IV may be used as well.
- Cervical and ovarian cancers: the "FIGO" system has been adopted into the TNM system. For premalignant dysplastic changes, the CIN (cervical intraepithelial neoplasia) grading system is used.
- Colon cancer: originally consisted of four stages: A, B, C, and D (the Dukes staging system). More recently, colon cancer staging is indicated either by the original A-D stages or by TNM.
- Kidney cancer: uses TNM.
- Cancer of the larynx: Uses TNM.
- Liver cancer: Uses TNM.
- Lung cancer: uses TNM.
- Melanoma: TNM used. Also of importance are the "Clark level" and "Breslow depth" which refer to the microscopic depth of tumor invasion ("Microstaging").
- Prostate cancer: TNM almost universally used.
- Testicular cancer: uses TNM along with a measure of blood serum markers (TNMS).
- Non-melanoma skin cancer: uses TNM.
- Bladder cancer: uses TNM.

== Overall stage grouping ==

Overall Stage Grouping is also referred to as Roman Numeral Staging. This system uses numerals I, II, III, and IV (plus the 0) to describe the progression of cancer.

- Stage 0: carcinoma in situ, abnormal cells growing in their normal place ("in situ" from Latin for "in its place").
  - Stage 0 can also mean no remaining cancer after preoperative treatment in some cancers (e.g. colorectal cancer).
- Stage I: cancers are localized to one part of the body. Stage I cancer can be surgically removed if small enough.
- Stage II: cancers are locally advanced. Stage II cancer can be treated by chemotherapy, radiation, or surgery.
- Stage III: cancers are also locally advanced. Whether a cancer is designated as Stage II or Stage III can depend on the specific type of cancer; for example, in Hodgkin lymphoma, Stage II indicates affected lymph nodes on only one side of the diaphragm, whereas Stage III indicates affected lymph nodes above and below the diaphragm. The specific criteria for Stages II and III therefore differ according to diagnosis. Stage III can be treated by chemotherapy, radiation, or surgery.
- Stage IV: cancers have often metastasized, or spread to other organs or throughout the body. Stage IV cancer can be treated by chemotherapy, radiation, or surgery. Despite treatment, a patient's mortality rate can be significantly higher with Stage IV cancer, e.g., the cancer can progress to become terminal.

Within the TNM system, a cancer may also be designated as recurrent, meaning that it has appeared again after being in remission or after all visible tumor has been eliminated. Recurrence can either be local, meaning that it appears in the same location as the original, or distant, meaning that it appears in a different part of the body.

== Stage migration ==
Stage migration is a change in the distribution of stages in a particular cancer population, induced by either a change in the staging system itself or else a change in technology which allows more sensitive detection of tumor spread and therefore more sensitivity in detecting spread of disease (e.g., the use of MRI scans). Stage migration can lead to curious statistical phenomena (for example, the Will Rogers phenomenon).
