= Les Dissonances =

- Origin: Paris, France
- Genres: classical music
- Years active: 2004–present
- Labels: ©Dissonances Records
- Website: www.les-dissonances.eu

Les Dissonances (The Dissonances) is a European classical music orchestra created in 2004 by the violinist David Grimal. Gathering French and European musicians, the orchestra is composed of international soloists, musicians from prestigious orchestras and young talents.

Since 2008, Les Dissonances are in residence at the Opéra de Dijon.

== Presentation ==
The collective was created on David Grimal's initiative in 2004.

The orchestra plays works of the symphonic repertoire self conducted, and varies in size according to the requirements of the repertoire, having an absolute freedom of interpretation.

Its repertoire includes most of the classical works (Mozart, Beethoven, Schubert, Brahms, Vivaldi) as well as modern and contemporary repertoire (Schoenberg, Dutilleux, Ligeti...).

The members of the Les Dissonances quartet are David Grimal (violin), Hans Peter Hofmann (violin), David Gaillard (viola) and Xavier Phillips (cello).

In order to develop knowledge of classical music among young people, Les Dissonances also leads educational projects as Violin workshops in schools (P' titssonances - Little Dissonances), educational concerts and open rehearsals.

== L'Autre Saison ==
The ensemble Les Dissonances also leads a social project for and with homeless people called L'Autre Saison (The other season). Once a month, Les Dissonances invites artists from different fields (musicians, singers, dancers, narrators, comedians) to take part of a charity concert on behalf of persons in difficult circumstances. The concerts take place in Paris, in the Church of Saint-Leu-Saint-Gilles de Paris The receipts help the association Les Margéniaux, who finance emergency and social reintegration projects.

== Residence and support ==
Les Dissonances is supported by the French Ministry of Arts and Communications and is a member of the FEVIS (French Federation of Vocal and instrumental Specialized ensembles). It has been in residence at the Dijon's Opera since 2008, and appears regularly at Cité de la musique in Paris, at Volcan in Le Havre and at l'Onde in Vélizy.

== Discography ==
- Brahms - Violin Concerto and Symphony n°4 │ Dissonances Records, March 2014
- Beethoven - Symphony n°5 │ Label Aparté, October 2011
- Vivaldi, Piazzolla – ‘’The Four Seasons’’│ Label Aparté, January 2011
- Beethoven - Violin Concerto and Symphony n°7 │ Label Aparté, October 2010
- Schoenberg and Strauss – ‘’Metamorphoses’’ │ Label Naïve Classique - Ambroisie, January 2007

== See also ==
- David Grimal, Founder and artistic director
