= Philippe Hirschhorn =

Latvian violinist

- Born: 11 June 1946
- Died: 26 November 1996 (aged 50)
- Instrument: violin

Philippe Hirschhorn (11 June 1946, Riga – 26 November 1996, Brussels) was a Soviet violinist. He won the Queen Elisabeth Music Competition in 1967, where he played Paganini violin concerto number 1 among other pieces. His first prize was beyond doubt. It is said that the jury was almost unanimous. He finished before Stova Milanova and Gidon Kremer. Among the jury were Arthur Grumiaux, Yehudi Menuhin and David Oistrakh. He was a violinist with an unrivaled technique and a hypnotic presence. He possessed a deeply felt and electrifying musicality. A citizen of the Soviet Union, he was born in Riga, Latvia and first studied at Darsin music school in Riga with Waldemar Sturestep. Later he studied with Michael Waiman at the Conservatoire of St. Petersburg.

Hirschhorn played concerts in Europe, America and Japan with orchestras conducted by Herbert von Karajan, Uri Segal, Eugene Ormandy, Yury Temirkanov, Gennady Rozhdestvensky, Gary Bertini, Ronald Zollman, among others. He played together with Roger Woodward, Elisabeth Leonskaya, Martha Argerich, James Tocco, Alexandre Rabinovitch-Barakovsky, Frederic Meinders, Hans Mannes, Brigitte Engerer and more. Hirschhorn was also a member of the jury of the Queen Elisabeth Music Completion in 1989 and 1993.

Hirschhorn had many students at the Conservatorium in Brussels and Utrecht. At the Utrecht conservatorium he taught from 1985 till his death in 1996, where he from 1989 was assisted by Arjen Beintema. Hirschhorn was the teacher of violinists such as Philippe Graffin, David Grimal, Cornelia Angerhofer, Janine Jansen, Yoris Jarzynski, Otto Tausk, Marie-Pierre Vendôme, and many others.

In 1996 Hirschhorn died from the effects of a brain tumor. He was buried at the Dieweg cemetery in Ukkel, a municipally of the Brussels capital region.This cemetery was closed in 1945 to new graves. Queen Fabiola asked the cemetery to make an exception for the violinist.
