= Will Rogers phenomenon =

Statistical phenomenon and paradox

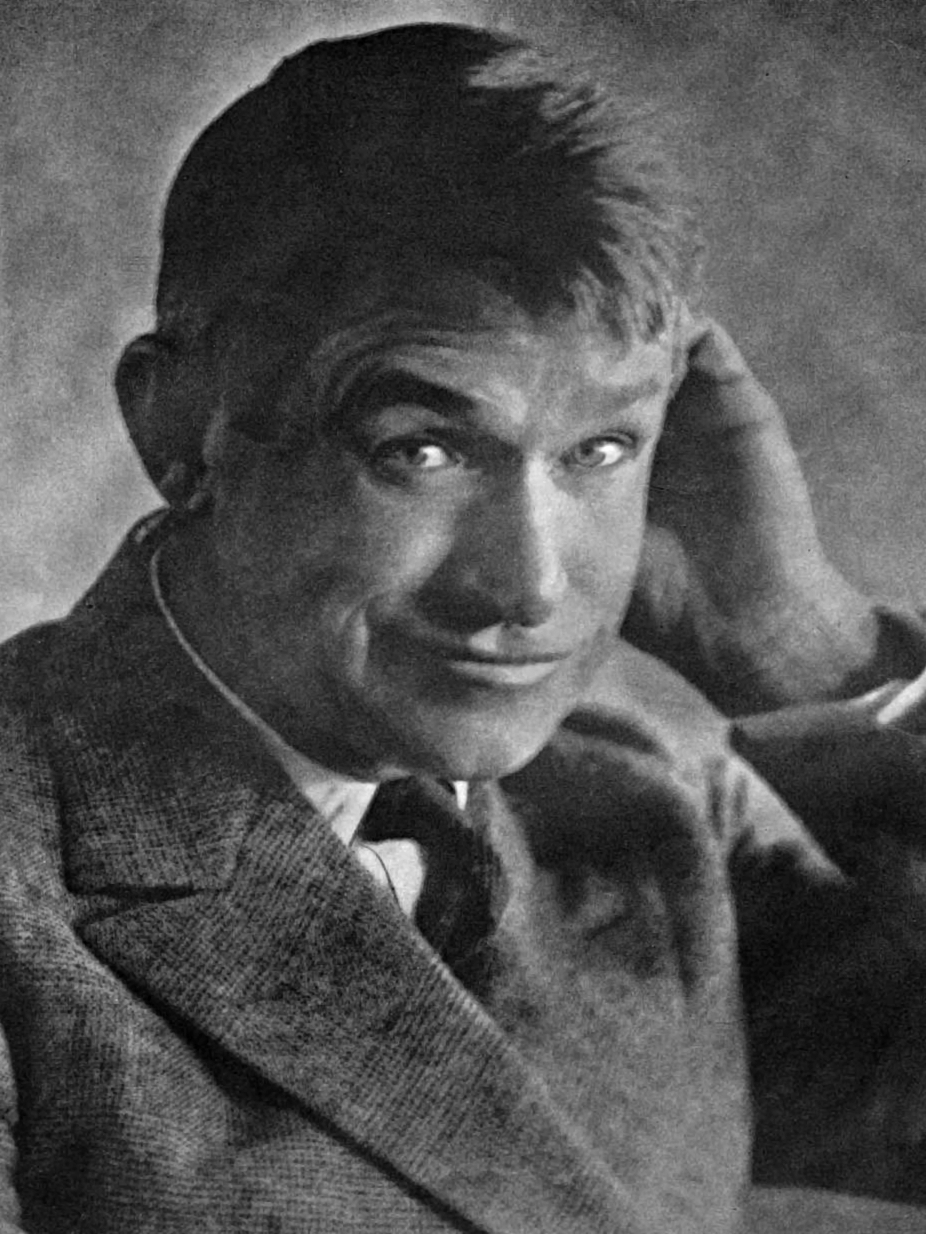
Will Rogers in 1922

The Will Rogers phenomenon, also rarely called the Okie paradox, is when moving an observation from one group to another increases the average of both groups. It is named after a joke attributed to the comedian Will Rogers about Dust Bowl migration during the Great Depression:

When the Okies left Oklahoma and moved to California, they raised the average intelligence level in both states.

The joke's premise is that Okies (Dust Bowl migrants from Oklahoma) were not as bright as the average Oklahoman, but smarter than the average Californian. This quotation was first attributed to native Oklahoman Rogers decades after his death; versions of the same joke with different places and people circulated at least 15 years before it can be linked to Okies.

The apparent paradox comes from the rise in intelligence of both groups, which makes it seem as though intelligence has been "created." However, the overall population maintains the same average intelligence: moving a person of moderate intelligence out of a high-intelligence group and into a low-intelligence group increases the mean intelligence of both the low- and the high-intelligence groups, while the overall population mean (which is a weighted average of the two groups' intelligence) is unaffected.

== Numerical examples ==
Consider the following sets R and S, whose arithmetic mean are 2.5 and 7, respectively.

$$\left \{\begin{array}{lll}
R & = \{ 1, 2, 3, 4 \} & (\text{mean} = 2.5)\\
S & = \{ {\bf 5}, 6, 7, 8, 9 \} & (\text{mean} = 7)
\end{array}\right \}
\rightarrow
\left \{\begin{array}{lll}
R & = \{ 1, 2, 3, 4, {\bf 5} \} & (\text{mean} = 3)\\
S & = \{ 6, 7, 8, 9 \} & (\text{mean} = 7.5)
\end{array}\right \}$$

If 5 is moved from S to R, then the arithmetic mean of R increases to 3, and the arithmetic mean of S increases to 7.5, even though the total set of numbers themselves, and therefore their overall average, have not changed.

Consider this more dramatic example, where the arithmetic means of sets R and S, are 1.5 and 10033, respectively:

$$\left \{\begin{array}{lll}
R & = \{ 1, 2 \} & (\text{mean} = 1.5)\\
S & = \{ {\bf 99}, 10\,000, 20\,000 \} & (\text{mean} = 10\,033)
\end{array}\right \}
\rightarrow
\left \{\begin{array}{lll}
R & = \{ 1, 2, {\bf 99} \} & (\text{mean} = 34)\\
S & = \{ 10\,000, 20\,000 \} & (\text{mean} = 15\,000)
\end{array}\right \}$$

If 99 is moved from S to R, then the arithmetic means increase to 34 and 15000. The number 99 is orders of magnitude above 1 and 2, and orders of magnitude below 10000 and 20000.

The element which is moved does not have to be the very lowest or highest of its set; it merely has to have a value that lies between the means of the two sets. And the sets themselves can have overlapping ranges. Consider this example:

$$\left \{\begin{array}{lll}
R & = \{ 1, 3, 5, 7, 9, 11, 13 \} & (\text{mean} = 7)\\
S & = \{ 6, 8, {\bf 10}, 12, 14, 16, 18 \} & (\text{mean} = 12)
\end{array}\right \}
\rightarrow
\left \{\begin{array}{lll}
R & = \{ 1, 3, 5, 7, 9, {\bf 10}, 11, 13 \} & (\text{mean} = 7.375)\\
S & = \{ 6, 8, 12, 14, 16, 18 \} & (\text{mean} = 12.333)
\end{array}\right \}$$

If 10, which is larger than R's mean of 7 and smaller than S's mean of 12, is moved from S to R, the arithmetic means still increase slightly, to 7.375 and 12.333.

== General application to subpopulation averaging ==
The phenomenon is a potential risk when comparing averages of subpopulations, because the outcome can change depending on how the population is divided rather than on changes of the individuals of the population. By extension, the average of the subpopulation averages would change even though there is no actual change within the population. This effect can result in non-intuitive or objectionable results in Pareto and related utilitarian analysis.

== Cancer stage migration ==
One real-world example of the phenomenon is seen in the medical concept of cancer stage migration, which led clinician Alvan Feinstein to coin the term Will Rogers phenomenon in 1985, based on a remark by a friend who attributed the quote to Rogers.

In medical stage migration, improved detection of illness leads to the movement of people from the set of healthy people to the set of unhealthy people. Because these people are actually not healthy — merely misclassified as healthy due to an imperfect earlier diagnosis — removing them from the set of healthy people increases the average lifespan of the healthy group. Likewise, the migrated people are healthier than the people already in the unhealthy set: their illness was so minor that only the newer more sensitive test could detect it. Adding them to the unhealthy raises the average lifespan of that group as well. Both lifespans are statistically lengthened, even if early detection of a cancer does not lead to better treatment: because it is detected earlier, more time is lived in the "unhealthy" set of people.

== See also ==
- Simpson's paradox
- Gerrymandering
