= David Grimal =

French violinist

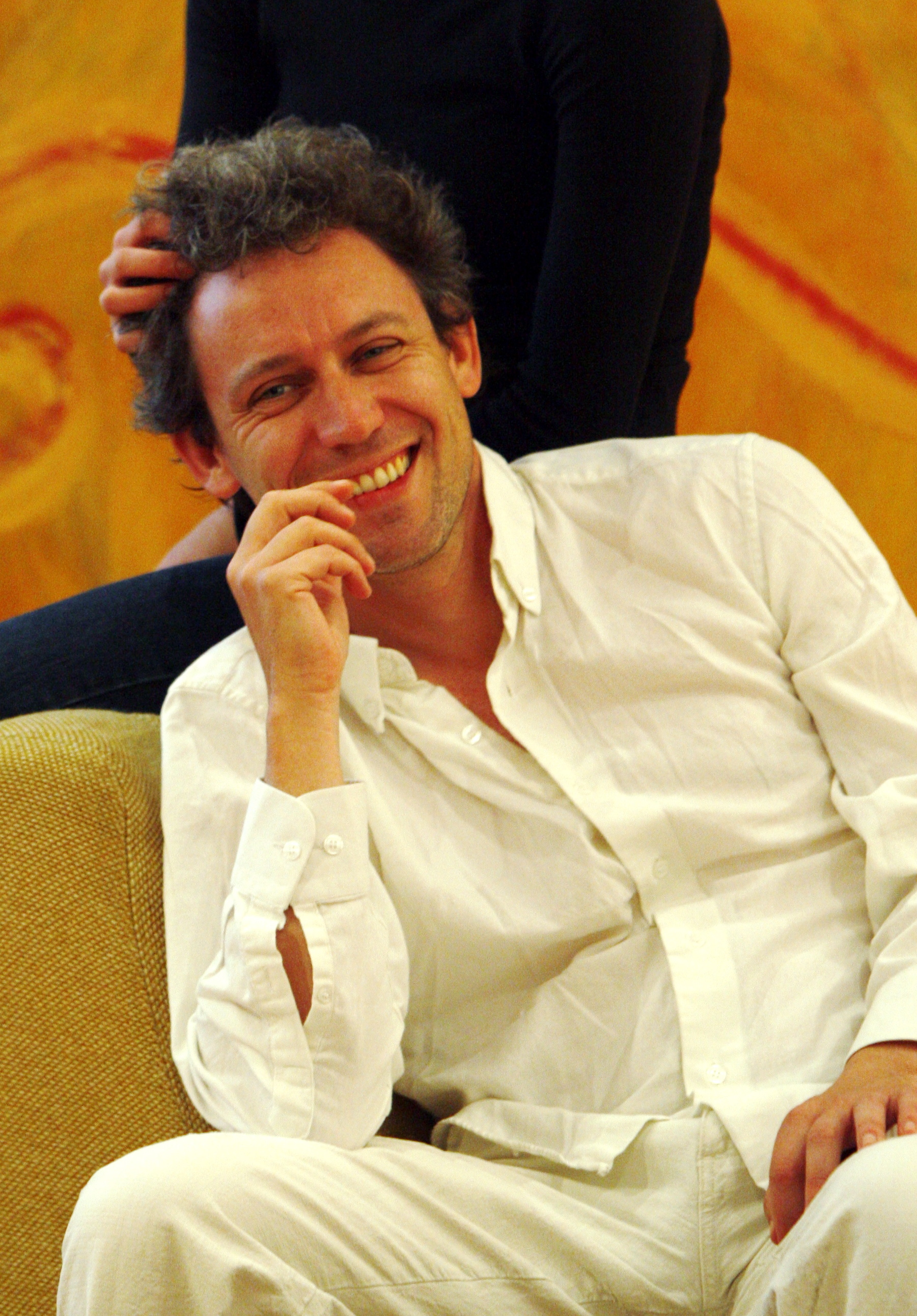
- Grimal in 2009

Background information
- Born: 9 February 1973 (age 53); Châtenay-Malabry
- Origin: France
- Genre: Classical
- Occupation: Violinist
- Instrument: Violin
- Years active: 1993–present
- Website: www.davidgrimal.com

David Grimal (born 1973) is a French violinist. He started to play the violin at the age of five. He won First Prize in violin and chamber music at the Conservatoire de Paris in 1993. Afterwards he did his postgraduate studies with Régis Pasquier. He also enriched and deepened his musicality by studying with such personalities as Philippe Hirschhorn, Shlomo Mintz, Isaac Stern. He is the son of Egyptologist Nicolas Grimal and the grand-son of Latinist Pierre Grimal. Mathematician Pierre Colmez is Grimal's first cousin.

== Activities ==
David Grimal pursued an international career as a solo violinist, which has seen him performing regularly at venues such as the Orchestre de Paris, Orchestre Philharmonique de Radio France, Russian National Orchestra, Orchestre National de Lyon, Chamber Orchestra of Europe, Berliner Symphoniker, New Japan Philharmonic, Orchestre de l'Opéra de Lyon, Mozarteum Orchestra Salzburg, Jerusalem Symphony Orchestra and Sinfonia Varsovia, under the direction of Christoph Eschenbach, Michel Plasson, Michael Schønwandt, Peter Csaba, Heinrich Schiff, Lawrence Foster, Emmanuel Krivine, Mikhail Pletnev, Rafael Frühbeck de Burgos and Péter Eötvös, Andris Nelsons, Christian Arming, among others.

He has been the honoured recipient of dedicated works by various composers, among whom are counted Marc-André Dalbavie, Brice Pauset, Thierry Escaich, Jean-François Zygel, Alexander Gasparov, Victor Kissine, Fuminori Tanada, Richard Dubugnon, Ivan Fedele, Philippe Harrowing, Anders Hillborg, Oscar Bianchi, Guillaume Connesson, Frederic Verrières, Richard Dubugnon and Eric Montalbetti.

An indefatigable researcher, he re-examines the early music repertory and in particular explores historically informed performance practice with such musicians as Andreas Staier, Brice Pauset, Mathieu Dupouy and Maude Gratton.

David Grimal teaches violin at the Musikhochschule, in Saarbrücken, Germany. He also presides over many Master Classes and was a member of the jury for the Long-Thibaud International Competition in Paris, in 2010.

He was appointed Chevalier des Arts et des Lettres by the French Ministre de la Culture in 2008.

== Les Dissonances ==
In addition to pursuing his career as a solo artist, David Grimal has been keen to explore more personal projects. The liberty afforded by his collaboration with Les Dissonances has enabled him to develop his inner universe by venturing into repertoires not available to soloists. With Les Dissonances, he has founded "L'Autre Saison", a series of concerts performed to the benefit of and with homeless people in the Église Saint-Leu, in the very heart of Paris.

== Artistic direction ==
Inspired by his experience with Les Dissonances, David Grimal develops projects as artistic director with other orchestras and regular ensembles. David Grimal rehearses the entire concert programme with the musicians in order to prepare them to play without a conductor at the concert. He shares the platform with them also by performing a concerto. He is invited by many orchestras to work with them and play the great violin concertos, notably Budapesti Vonosok, Anima Chamber Orchestra, Sinfonietta Cracovia, Moscow Chamber Orchestra, Orquesta Sinfónica de Galicia, Orchestra Sinfonica de Murcia, Bilbao Orkestra Sinfonikoa, Orchestre de l'Opéra national de Lorraine, National Orchestra of Metz, Orchestre Philharmonique de Strasbourg, Taipei Symphony Orchestra…

== Instrument ==
David Grimal plays the Ex Roederer, Stradivarius (1710) lent by Fazenda Ipiranga, Mguaranesia / MG, Brasil. He was awarded the European Culture Prize at Wiener Musikverein in 1996. France made him Chevalier des Arts et Lettres in 2008.
