= Pierre Colmez =

French mathematician (born 1962)

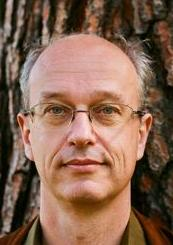
- Born: 1962 (age 63–64)
- Education: École Normale Supérieure; University of Grenoble.
- Children: Coralie Colmez
- Awards: Fermat Prize (2005)
- Scientific career
- Fields: Mathematics
- Workplaces: CNRS; Sorbonne University
- Doctoral advisor: John H. Coates; Jean-Marc Fontaine

Pierre Colmez (born 1962) is a French mathematician and directeur de recherche at the CNRS (IMJ-PRG) known for his work in number theory and p-adic analysis.

== Education ==
Colmez studied at École Normale Supérieure and obtained his doctorate from the University of Grenoble.

== Research ==
He works on special values of L-functions and $p$-adic representations of $p$-adic groups at the meeting point of Fontaine's and Langlands' programs. His contributions include:

- A proof of a $p$-adic analog of Dirichlet's analytic class number formula.
- A conjecture: the Colmez conjecture relating Artin L-functions at $s=0$ and periods of abelian varieties with complex multiplication, a far-reaching generalization of the Chowla-Selberg formula.
- A proof of Perrin-Riou's conjectural explicit reciprocity law related to the functional equation of $p$-adic L-functions.
- Several contributions to Fontaine's program of classification of $p$-adic representations of the absolute Galois group of a finite extension of $\mathbb{Q}_p$, including proofs of conjectures of Fontaine such as "weakly admissible implies admissible" and the "$p$-adic monodromy conjecture" which describe representations coming from geometry, or the overconvergence of all representations, and the addition of new concepts such as "trianguline representations" or "Banach-Colmez spaces".
- A construction of the $p$-adic local Langlands correspondence for $\mathrm{GL}_2(\mathbb{Q}_p)$, via the construction of a functor (known as "Colmez's functor" or "Colmez's Montreal functor") from representation of $\mathrm{GL}_2(\mathbb{Q}_p)$ to representations of the absolute Galois group of $\mathbb{Q}_p$.
- Comparison theorems for $p$-adic algebraic and analytic varieties with applications to a geometrization of the $p$-adic local Langlands correspondence.

With Jean-Pierre Serre, he co-edited the Correspondance Grothendieck-Serre (2001) and the Correspondance Serre-Tate (2015).

== Awards and honors ==
Colmez won the 2005 Fermat Prize for his contributions to the study of L-functions and p-adic Galois representations.

In 1998, he was an invited speaker at the International Congress of Mathematicians in Berlin.

Colmez has won the French Go championship four times.

== Personal life ==
Pierre Colmez and Leila Schneps are the parents of Coralie Colmez. Violinist David Grimal is Colmez's first cousin.
