= Leila Schneps =

American mathematician and novelist

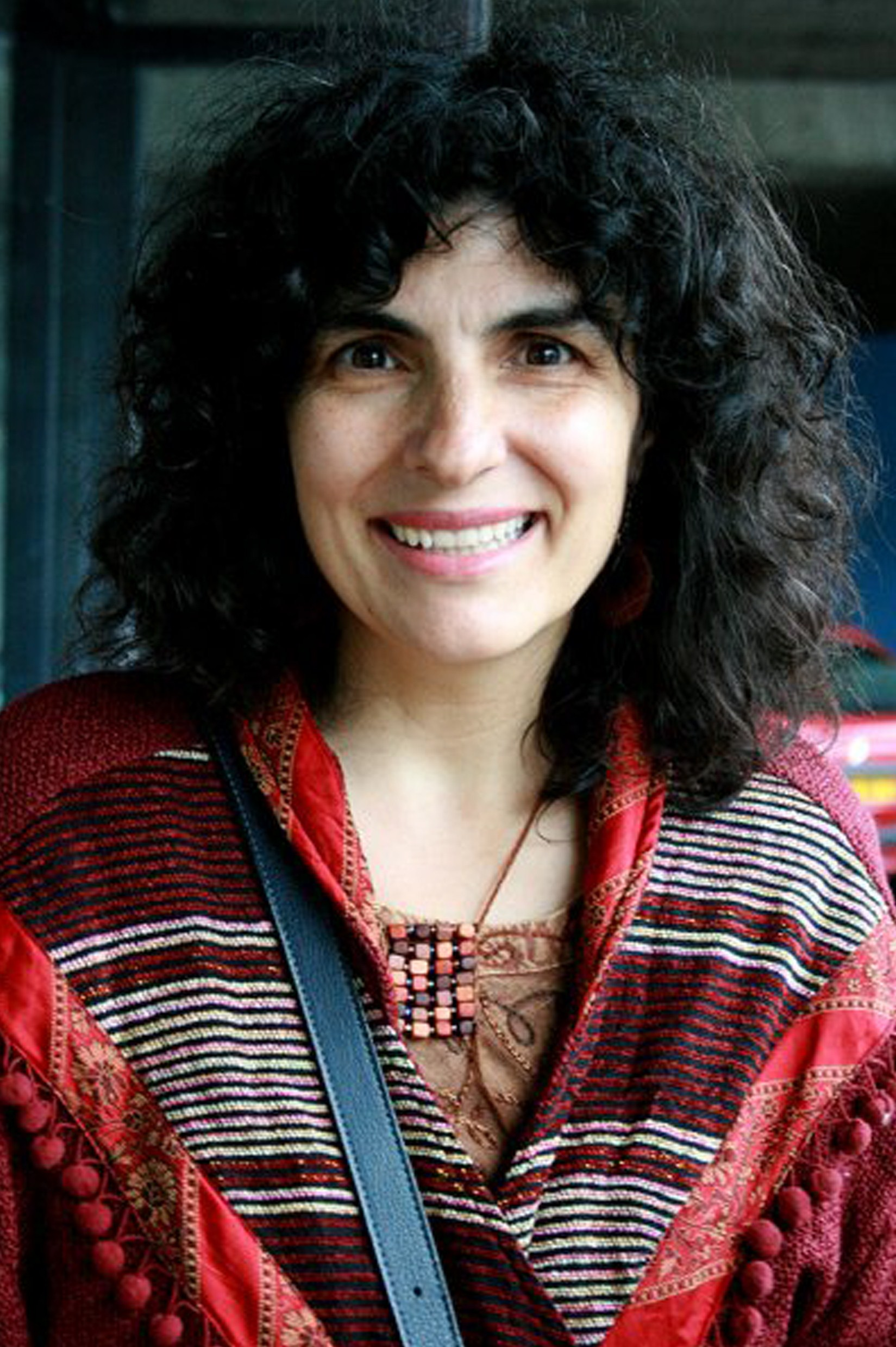
- Education: PhD
- Alma mater: University of Paris
- Occupations: Mathematician; Author
- Children: Coralie Colmez, Natacha Colmez, Alexandre Lochak, Mélisande Lochak
- Writing career
- Pen name: Catherine Shaw
- Language: English; French; German
- Subject: Mathematics
- Website: www.math.jussieu.fr/~leila

Leila Schneps is an American mathematician and fiction writer at the Centre national de la recherche scientifique working in number theory. Schneps has written general audience math books and, under the pen name Catherine Shaw, has written mathematically themed murder mysteries.

== Education ==
Schneps earned a B.A. in mathematics, German Language and Literature from Radcliffe College in 1983. She completed a Doctorat de Troisième Cycle in Mathematics at Université Paris-Sud XI-Orsay in 1985 under the supervision of John H. Coates with a thesis on p-adic L-functions attached to elliptic curves, a Ph.D. in mathematics in 1990 with a thesis on p-Adic L-functions and Galois groups, and Habilitation at Université de Franche-Comté in 1993, with a thesis on the Inverse Galois problem.

== Professional experience ==
Schneps held various teaching assistant positions in France and Germany until the completion of her Ph.D. in 1990, then worked as a postdoctoral assistant at the ETH in Zurich, Switzerland, for one year. In 1991 she was awarded a tenured research position at CNRS, the French National Centre for Scientific Research, at the University of Franche-Comté in Besançon. During the late 1990s Schneps also had short-term visiting researcher assignments at Harvard University, the Institute for Advanced Study at Princeton, and MSRI at Berkeley.

== Publications ==
=== Academic ===
Schneps has published academic papers on various aspects of analytic number theory since the late 1980s. Her early work explored p-adic L-functions, which became the topic of her first thesis, and around 2010 she was continuing to work on the related fields of zeta functions.

Since the late 1990s she focused on aspects of Galois theory, including Galois groups, geometric Galois actions, and the inverse Galois problem, and has been described by Jordan Ellenberg as "the arithmetic geometer ... who taught me most of what I know about Galois actions on fundamental groups of varieties". Her work led to her study of the related Grothendieck–Teichmüller group, and she has become a member of a group preserving the works and history of Grothendieck. In the early 2010s she published research investigating various aspects of Lie algebras.

=== Books ===
Schneps has also edited and contributed to several mathematics textbooks in number theory. She edited a series of lecture notes on Grothendieck's theory of dessins d'enfants and contributed an article to the series, was an editor for a text on the Inverse Galois Problem, and edited a book on Galois groups. She was a co-author of a text on Field Theory and co-editor of another on Galois–Teichmüller Theory.

In 2013, Schneps and her daughter, mathematician Coralie Colmez, published the book Math on Trial: How Numbers Get Used and Abused in the Courtroom. Targeted at a general audience, the book uses ten historical legal cases to show how mathematics, especially statistics, can affect the outcome of criminal proceedings, especially when incorrectly applied or interpreted. The mathematical concepts covered include statistical independence (discussed using the examples of the Sally Clark case and the murder of Meredith Kercher), Simpson's paradox (UC Berkeley gender bias case) and statistical modeling using a binomial distribution (Howland will forgery trial).

While not written as a textbook, some reviewers found it suitable for students, as an introduction to the topic and to "get them thinking, talking and even arguing about the issues involved", with another agreeing that, "they have struck the right balance of providing enough mathematics for the specialist to check out the details, but not so much as to overwhelm the general reader", and another finding the book suitable "for parents trying to support teenagers in their studies of mathematics – or in fact, law".

While most reviews were positive, there was some criticism concerning its over-simplification of mathematics' influence in complex trial proceedings. One reviewer finds that, while the book's description of the weakness of some mathematics presented in courtrooms is valid, the text magnifies mathematics' role in legal proceedings, which traditionally feature evidentiary analysis at appellate as well as trial stages and have preexisting standards for treating certain types of evidence. Another suggests the book was influenced by the authors' selection of cases to show a "disastrous record of causing judicial error", thus attributing insufficient weight to the counterbalancing traditionally inherent in legal proceedings—as lawyers attack opposing evidence and experts with their own, and appellate judges write to influence the conduct of trial judges faced with various types of ordinary and expert testimony.

=== Translations ===
Schneps has produced English-language translations of several French-language books and papers, including: Invitation to the mathematics of Fermat-Wiles; Galois theory; A Mathematician Grappling With His Century; Hodge Theory and Complex Algebraic Geometry II; p-adic L-Functions and p-Adic Representations; and Renormalization methods : critical phenomena, chaos, fractal structures; Reaping and Sowing.

== Grothendieck Circle ==
Mathematician Alexander Grothendieck became a recluse in 1991 and removed his published works from circulation. More than a decade later, Schneps and Pierre Lochak located him in a town in the Pyrenees, then carried on a correspondence. Thus they became among "the last members of the mathematical establishment to come into contact with him". Schneps became a founding member of the Grothendieck Circle, a group dedicated to making information by and about Grothendieck available, and created and maintains the Grothendieck Circle website, a repository of information regarding Grothendieck, including his own unpublished writings. She also assisted with the translation of his correspondence with Jean-Pierre Serre.

== Fiction writing ==
In 2004, Schneps published (as Catherine Shaw) The Three Body Problem, a Cambridge Mystery, a murder mystery novel involving mathematicians in Cambridge in the late 1800s, working on the three-body problem. The title is a double entendre, referring to both the mathematical problem and the three murder victims. While a mathematician reviewing the book disliked the Victorian writing style, he found the math accurate, and the mathematicians' personalities and sociology "well portrayed". When another reviewer contacted the author, she confirmed that Catherine Shaw was a pseudonym and that she was actually an academic and practicing mathematician but preferred to remain anonymous. It has since been revealed that Catherine Shaw is the pseudonym of Leila Schneps.

Schneps, as Catherine Shaw, has published four historical novels in the series, all featuring the same main character Vanessa Duncan, and all following mathematical themes:

- Flowers Stained with Moonlight was called a mystery that was "very easy to solve", as the book's title is from a poem by Lord Alfred Douglas, which strongly hints at the solution to the crime.
- The Library Paradox also has a double entendre title, as the story is a classic locked room mystery set in a library, but also alludes to Russell's paradox, which arises from the question of whether a library catalog should include itself in its contents. The murder victim in the story was antisemitic, and the story mentions the Dreyfus affair and explores the issues of "being Jewish in 1896 London".
- The Riddle of the River explores "the theatre world, the late 19th century craze for séances, [and] the Marconi revolution which will lead to the invention of the telegraph".
- Fatal Inheritance explores "the importance of heredity and how it might influence the nation's health; Dr Freud's latest theories; and ... the dubious 'science' of eugenics".

As Shaw, Schneps has also published a non-fiction guide to solving Sudoku and Kakuro puzzles.

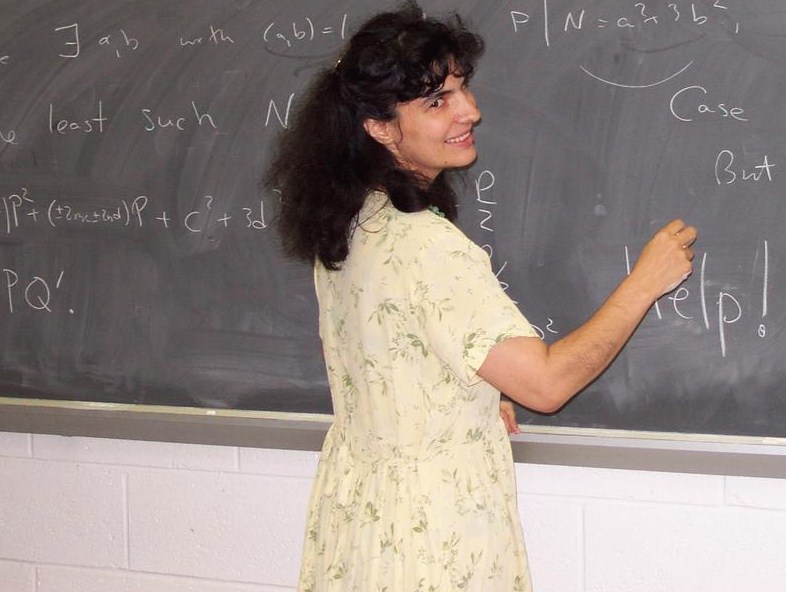

== Activism ==
Schneps promotes public awareness of the importance of the proper use of mathematics and statistics in criminal proceedings. Schneps is a member of the Bayes and the Law International Consortium.

== Personal life ==
Coralie Colmez is the daughter of Schneps and Pierre Colmez.
