= Coralie Colmez =

Mathematics tutor and author

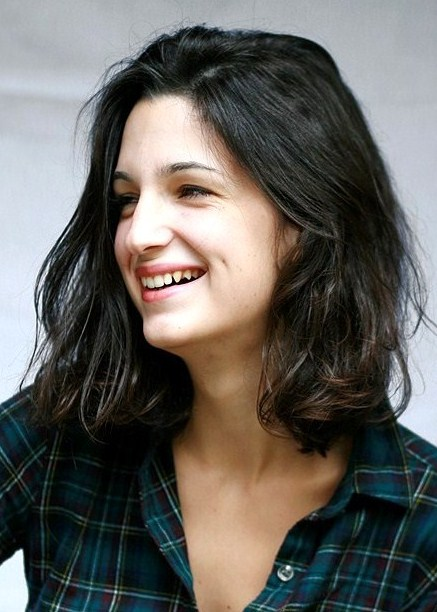
- Education: University of Cambridge (B.A.)
- Occupations: Author, tutor
- Writing career
- Language: English, French
- Subject: Mathematics

Coralie Colmez is a French author and tutor in mathematics and mathematics education.

== Early life and career ==
Coralie Colmez is the daughter of mathematicians Pierre Colmez and Leila Schneps. Colmez was raised in Paris.

After completing her secondary education in Paris, Colmez moved to the United Kingdom and attended Gonville and Caius College of the University of Cambridge under a Cambridge European Trust scholarship, completing a first-class Bachelor of Arts in Mathematics and winning the Ryan Prize in Higher Mathematics.

== Professional ==
Colmez worked for one year as a research assistant on Carol Vorderman's task force, commissioned by the UK government to study the state of mathematics education in the United Kingdom, and assisted with the presentation of the findings to the Joint Mathematics Council. She is now a co-director of unifrog, an organization that helps students discover future career pathways, apprenticeships and university courses, and teachers track their progress.

== Writing ==
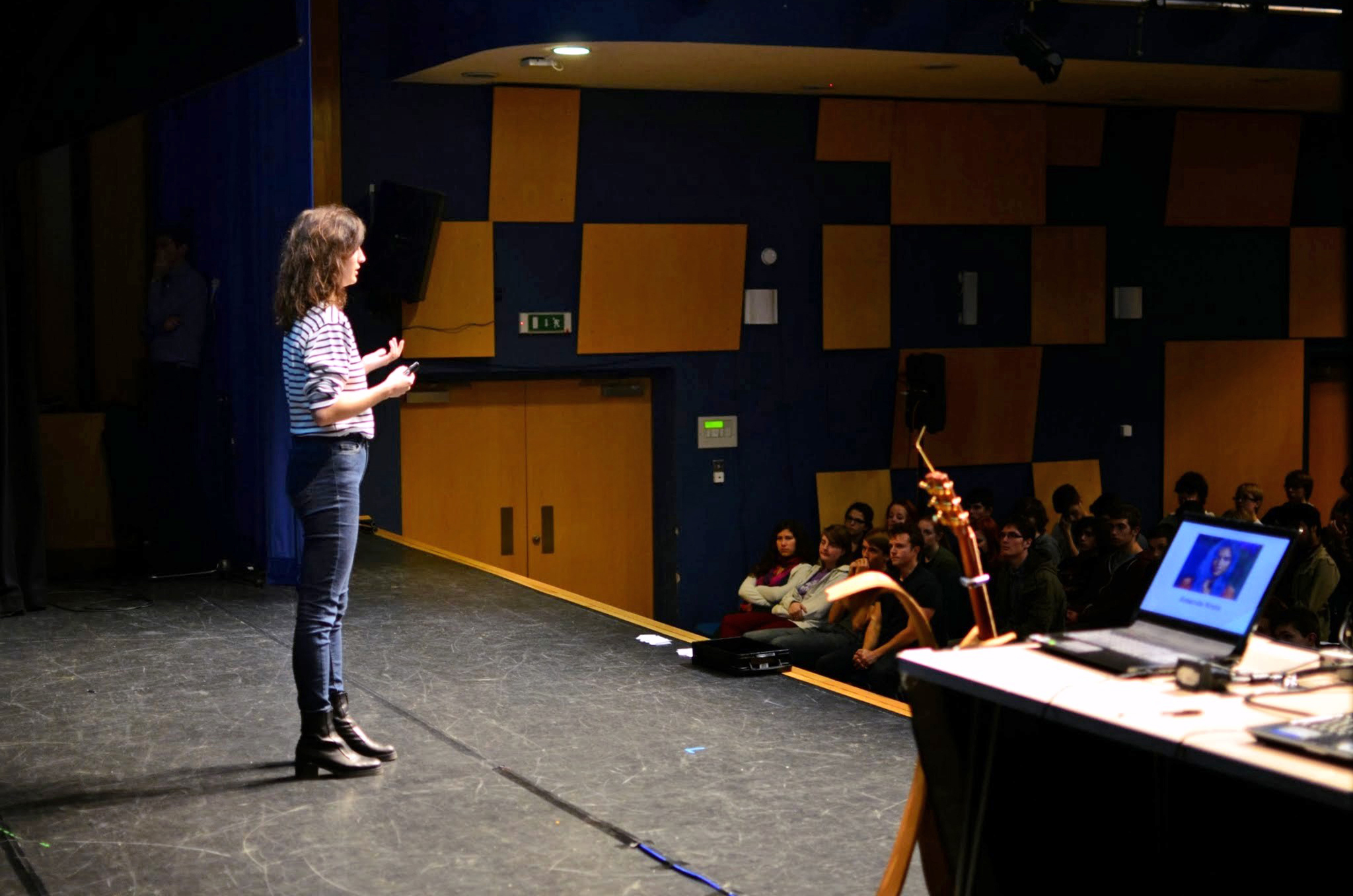
Coralie Colmez addressing students

With her mother, mathematician Leila Schneps, Colmez co-authored Math on Trial: How Numbers Get Used and Abused in the Courtroom. This book, published in 2013 by Basic Books, targeted for a general audience, uses ten historical legal cases to show how mathematics, especially statistics, can affect the outcome of criminal proceedings, especially when incorrectly applied or interpreted. In 2022 Coralie published The Irrational Diary of Clara Valentine, a YA novel which includes high level mathematical concepts with the aim to introduce them to younger readers.

== Public speaking ==
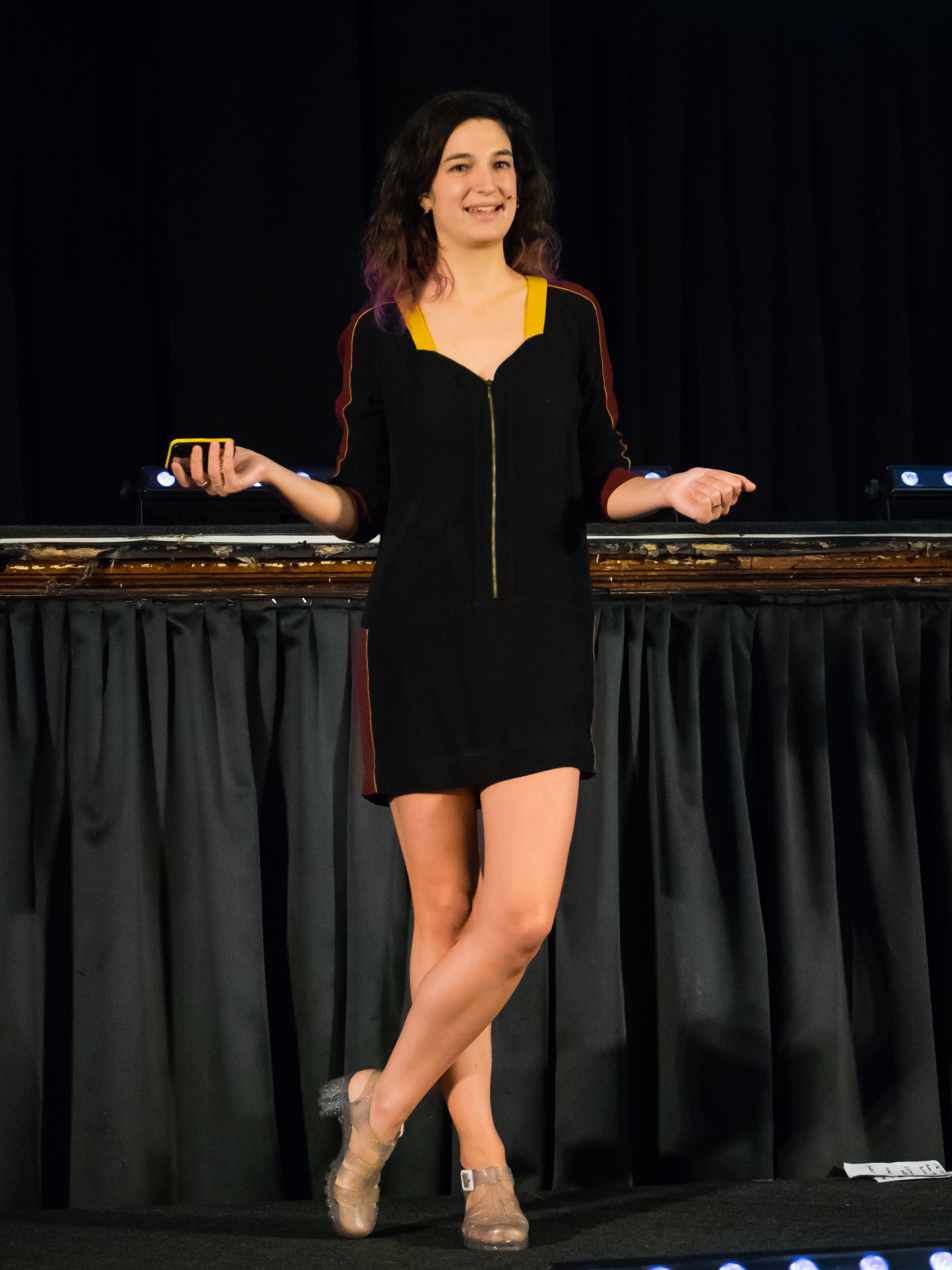
Coralie Colmez speaking at QEDCon conference in 2014

Since the publication of Math on Trial, Colmez has been an invited speaker at scientific education events in the UK. She has presented to the Conway Hall Ethical Society, the Cambridge Centre for Sixth-Form Studies, several shows for Maths Inspiration, including one at the University of Cambridge, and the 2014 QED conference. She has appeared on BBC Radio 4's Today Programme, discussing her book's subject of criminal trials in which math is used incorrectly or insufficiently, and on the BBC Radio 4 podcast, More or Less, discussing the same topic in relation to the Amanda Knox case.
