= Generalized anxiety disorder =

Nonspecific long-lasting anxiety

- Other names: Generalised anxiety disorder
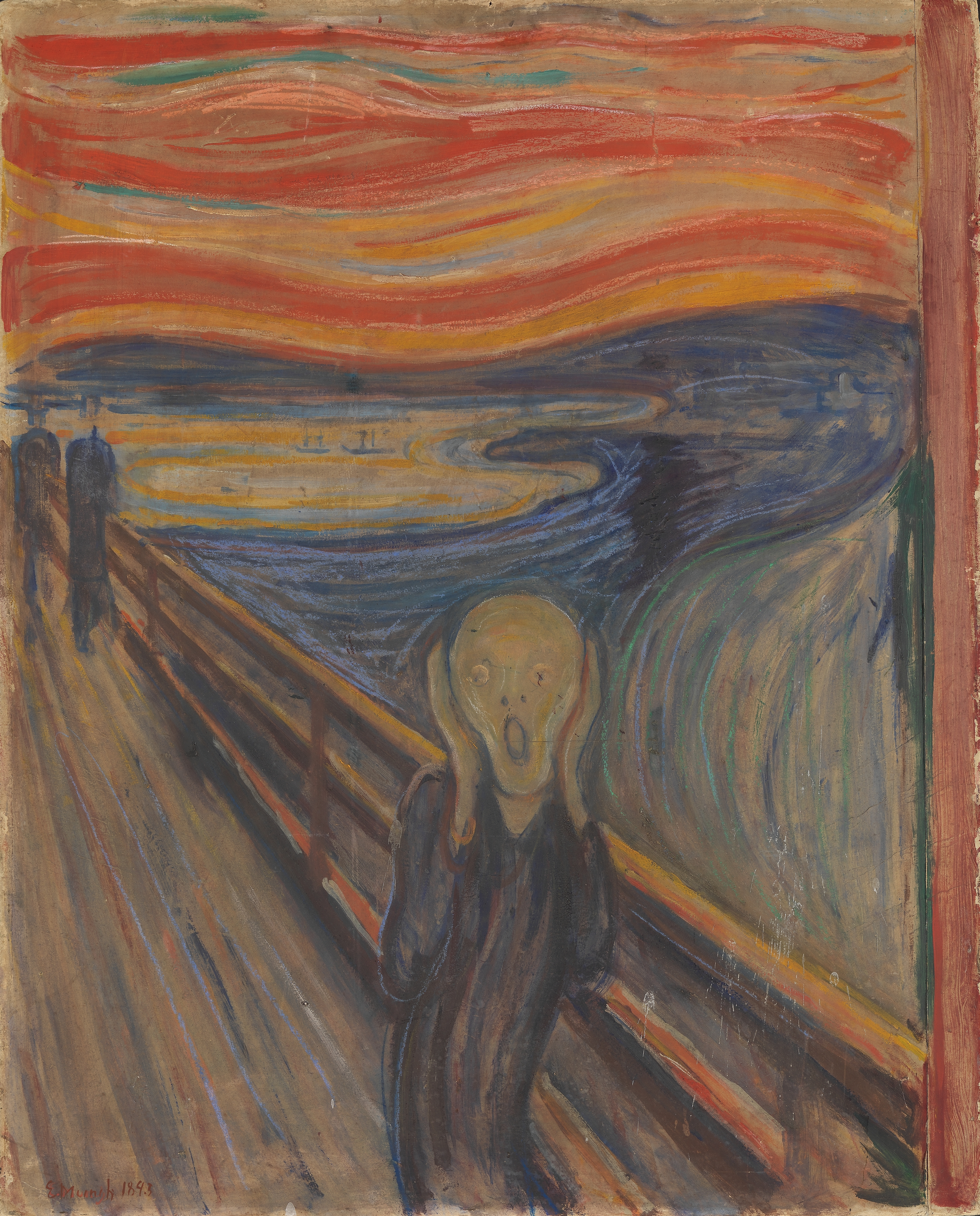
- The Scream (Norwegian: Skrik), a painting by Norwegian artist Edvard Munch
- Specialty: Psychiatry, psychology
- Symptoms: Excessive worry, restlessness, trouble sleeping, feeling tired, irritability, difficulty concentrating, muscle tension, sweating, trembling
- Complications: Paranoia, depression, heart disease, suicide
- Usual onset: Childhood to early teenage
- Risk factors: Family history
- Differential diagnosis: Panic disorder, post-traumatic stress disorder, social anxiety disorder, borderline personality disorder, antisocial personality disorder, obsessive–compulsive disorder, specific phobia
- Treatment: Counseling, medication
- Medication: Anxiolytics, antidepressants
- Frequency: 3–5% (lifetime prevalence)

Generalized anxiety disorder (GAD) is an anxiety disorder characterized by excessive, uncontrollable, and often irrational worry about events or activities. Worry often interferes with daily functioning. Individuals with GAD are often, but not necessarily, overly concerned about everyday matters such as health, finances, death, family, relationship concerns, or work difficulties. Symptoms may include excessive worry, restlessness, trouble sleeping, exhaustion, irritability, sweating, and trembling.

Symptoms must be consistent and ongoing, persisting at least six months for a formal diagnosis. Individuals with GAD often have other disorders including other psychiatric disorders, substance use disorder, or obesity, and may have a history of trauma or family with GAD. Clinicians use screening tools such as the GAD-7 and GAD-2 questionnaires to determine if individuals may have GAD and warrant formal evaluation for the disorder. In addition, screening tools may enable clinicians to evaluate the severity of GAD symptoms.

Treatment includes types of psychotherapy and pharmacological intervention; combined therapy is generally considered most effective. Cognitive behavioral therapy (CBT) and selective serotonin reuptake inhibitors (SSRIs) and serotonin–norepinephrine reuptake inhibitors (SNRIs) are the first-line psychological and pharmacological treatments. In more severe, last-resort cases, benzodiazepines (BZs) may be used, as BZs are habit-forming and frequently abused. Pregabalin is an additional effective treatment for GAD; it has a low risk of dependence. The potential effects of complementary and alternative medications (CAMs), exercise, therapeutic massage, and other interventions have been studied. Brain stimulation, LSD, and other novel therapeutic interventions are also under study.

Genetic and environmental factors both contribute to GAD. A hereditary component influenced by brain structure and neurotransmitter function interacts with life stressors such as parenting style and abusive relationships. Emerging evidence also links problematic digital media use to increased anxiety. GAD involves heightened amygdala and prefrontal cortex activity, reflecting an overactive threat-response system. It affects about 2–6% of adults worldwide, usually begins in adolescence or early adulthood, is more common in women, and often recurs throughout life. GAD was defined as a separate diagnosis in 1980, with changing criteria over time that have complicated research and treatment development.

== Causes ==
=== Genetics, family, and environment ===
The relationship between genetics and anxiety disorders remains an active area of investigation. Although GAD is understood to have a hereditary basis, the precise mechanisms remain unclear. Researchers have identified several genetic loci of interest, but no single gene or set of genes has been definitively linked to the disorder. Genetic elements contribute to an individual's risk of developing GAD, to structural changes in the brain associated with anxiety, and to variability in treatment response. Genetics is typically considered alongside environmental exposures, such as adverse life experiences and chronic stress.

Evidence from family and twin studies supports a strong genetic component, showing that GAD occurs more frequently among first-degree relatives than in unrelated individuals. Funk and colleagues, in a June 2025 article in Psychological Medicine, reported that genetic factors accounted for continuity in GAD symptoms, while environmental factors drove symptom changes. Heritability at single assessments was 39–46%; when stability across ages 23–26 was modeled, heritability rose to ~60%, highlighting stronger genetic influence in persistent GAD. Summarizing twin and genome-wide association studies in a 2025 article in Psychiatric Clinics of North America, Weber and colleagues reported that overall genetic contribution to anxiety disorders, including GAD, ranges from 30 to 50%, with SNP‑based heritability between 5–30%. This suggests that common variants explain only part of the risk, while rare variants and epigenetic processes contribute substantially. Twin studies further suggest a genetic linkage between GAD and major depressive disorder (MDD), which may account for the high frequency of comorbidity—estimated at roughly 60%—between the two conditions.

Environmental influences have been examined in relation to parenting styles, with suggestions that parental modeling of anxious behaviors may contribute to risk. Individuals with GAD also appear to experience a greater number of minor stress-related events, and these cumulative stressors may be significant in the disorder's development. Social context has been shown to matter as well; research highlights associations between interpersonal difficulties and GAD, including findings that partner abuse in women is strongly linked to anxiety symptoms. Strained or abusive relationships therefore appear to be one environmental factor associated with the emergence of GAD.

Genetic studies have also explored the role of genes involved in brain structures such as the amygdala, as well as those affecting neurotransmitter systems and receptor activity. Among the genes studied, several have been linked to treatment response. For example, the Asp54Gly polymorphism of the pituitary adenylate cyclase-activating peptide, which is the product of the ADCYAP1 gene, has been associated with remission following venlafaxine treatment for GAD. Variants in the gene encoding serotonin receptor 2A, HTR2A, particularly the rs7997012 SNP G allele, have been implicated in reductions in anxiety symptoms after venlafaxine therapy. Finally, interactions between serotonin transporter gene SLC6A4 and HTR2A polymorphisms have also been shown to predict venlafaxine treatment response.

=== Problematic digital media use ===
There is evidence of weak to moderate associations between gaming disorder or smartphone use and social anxiety and depressive symptoms, and nomophobia. However these are also not causal, the nature of the associations is not clear. There is also some evidence of bi-directionality. There are some conflicting results from systematic reviews. There are also some links between the amount of personal information uploaded, and social media addictive behaviors all correlated with anxiety.

== Pathophysiology ==
Amygdala (in red) brain structures linked to anxiety disorders

The pathophysiology of GAD is an active and ongoing area of research, often involving the intersection of genetics and neurological structures. GAD has been linked to changes in functional connectivity of the amygdala and its processing of fear and anxiety. Sensory information enters the amygdala through the nuclei of the basolateral complex (consisting of lateral, basal, and accessory basal nuclei). The basolateral complex processes the sensory-related fear memories and communicates information regarding threat importance to memory and sensory processing elsewhere in the brain, such as the medial prefrontal cortex and sensory cortices. Neurological structures traditionally appreciated for their roles in anxiety include the amygdala, insula and orbitofrontal cortex (OFC). It is broadly postulated that changes in one or more of these neurological structures are believed to allow greater amygdala response to emotional stimuli in individuals who have GAD as compared to individuals who do not have GAD.

Individuals with GAD have been suggested to exhibit greater activation of the amygdala and medial prefrontal cortex (mPFC) in response to stimuli than individuals without GAD. However, the exact relationship between the amygdala and the frontal cortex (e.g., the prefrontal cortex or the orbitofrontal cortex [OFC]) remains poorly understood, as some studies report increased or decreased activity in the frontal cortex in individuals with GAD. Consequently, because of the tenuous understanding of the frontal cortex as it relates to the amygdala in individuals who have GAD, it's an open question as to whether individuals who have GAD bear an amygdala that is more sensitive than an amygdala in an individual without GAD or whether frontal cortex hyperactivity is responsible for changes in amygdala responsiveness to various stimuli. Recent studies have attempted to identify specific regions of the frontal cortex (e.g., dorsomedial prefrontal cortex [dmPFC]) that may be more or less reactive in individuals who have GAD or specific networks that may be differentially implicated in individuals who have GAD. Other lines of study investigate whether activation patterns vary in individuals who have GAD at different ages with respect to individuals who do not have GAD at the same age (e.g., amygdala activation in adolescents with GAD).

=== Evolutionary explanations ===
From an evolutionary perspective, generalized anxiety can be viewed as an overextension of the protective mechanisms that help organisms avoid danger. Cost–benefit analyses, sometimes referred to as the "smoke detector principle" propose that false alarms (unnecessary worry) are less costly than failing to detect real threats. As a result, having a relatively low threshold for perceiving danger may have historically conferred survival benefits. In individuals with GAD, however, this adaptive threshold appears to be set too low or activated too often, generating pervasive worry about routine events and relatively minor stressors.

Empirical work supports the idea that GAD involves heightened reactivity in brain regions associated with threat detection, including the amygdala. Researchers have also found links between GAD and elevated inflammation markers, suggesting a possible physiological correlate for the chronic anxiety seen in the disorder. Although anxiety's defensive functions may have been advantageous in unpredictable environments, modern contexts can render this vigilance maladaptive when it persists as near-constant worry and avoidance. This view places GAD at the extreme end of a continuum, where otherwise beneficial anxiety responses overshoot, leading to significant distress and functional impairment.

== Diagnosis ==
=== DSM-5 criteria ===
The diagnostic criteria for GAD as defined by the Diagnostic and Statistical Manual of Mental Disorders, Fifth Edition (DSM-5), published by the American Psychiatric Association, are paraphrased as follows:

1. "Excessive anxiety or worry" experienced most days over at least six months and which involve a plurality of concerns.
2. Inability to manage worry.
3. At least three of the following occur:
  1. Restlessness
  2. Fatigability
  3. Problems concentrating
  4. Irritability
  5. Muscle tension
  6. Difficulty with sleep
  Note that in children, only one of the above items is required.
4. One experiences significant distress in functioning (e.g., work, school, social life).
5. Symptoms are not due to a substance use disorder, prescription medication, or other medical condition(s).
6. Symptoms do not fit better with another psychiatric condition such as panic disorder.

No major changes to GAD have occurred since publication of the Diagnostic and Statistical Manual of Mental Disorders (2004); minor changes include wording of diagnostic criteria.

=== ICD-10 criteria ===
The 10th revision of the International Statistical Classification of Diseases (ICD-10) provides a different set of diagnostic criteria for GAD than the DSM-5 criteria described above. In particular, ICD-10 allows diagnosis of GAD as follows:

1. A period of at least six months with prominent tension, worry, and feelings of apprehension, about everyday events and problems.
2. At least four symptoms out of the following list of items must be present, of which at least one from items (1) to (4).
  Autonomic arousal symptoms
  (1) Palpitations or pounding heart, or accelerated heart rate.
  (2) Sweating.
  (3) Trembling or shaking.
  (4) Dry mouth (not due to medication or dehydration).
  Symptoms concerning the chest and abdomen
  (5) Difficulty breathing.
  (6) Feeling of choking.
  (7) Chest pain or discomfort.
  (8) Nausea or abdominal distress (e.g., churning in the stomach).
  Symptoms concerning the brain and mind
  (9) Feeling dizzy, unsteady, faint, or light-headed.
  (10) Feelings that objects are unreal (derealization), or that one's self is distant or "not really here" (depersonalization).
  (11) Fear of losing control, going crazy, or passing out.
  (12) Fear of dying.
  General symptoms
  (13) Hot flashes or cold chills.
  (14) Numbness or tingling sensations.
  Symptoms of tension
  (15) Muscle tension or aches and pains.
  (16) Restlessness and inability to relax.
  (17) Feeling keyed up, or on edge, or of mental tension.
  (18) A sensation of a lump in the throat or difficulty with swallowing.
  Other non-specific symptoms
  (19) Exaggerated response to minor surprises or being startled.
  (20) Difficulty in concentrating or mind going blank, because of worrying or anxiety.
  (21) Persistent irritability.
  (22) Difficulty getting to sleep because of worrying.
3. The disorder does not meet the criteria for panic disorder (F41.0), phobic anxiety disorders (F40.-), obsessive–compulsive disorder (F42.-) or hypochondriacal disorder (F45.2).
4. Most commonly used exclusion criteria: not sustained by a physical disorder, such as hyperthyroidism, an organic mental disorder (F0) or psychoactive substance-related disorder (F1), such as excess consumption of amphetamine-like substances, or withdrawal from benzodiazepines.

See ICD-10 F41.1 Note: For children different ICD-10 criteria may be applied for diagnosing GAD (see F93.80).

== Treatment ==
Traditional treatment modalities broadly fall into two categories: psychotherapeutic and pharmacological intervention. In addition to these two conventional therapeutic approaches, areas of active investigation include complementary and alternative medications (CAMs), brain stimulation, exercise, therapeutic massage, balneotherapy, and other interventions that have been proposed for further study. Treatment modalities can, and often are, used concurrently so that an individual may pursue psychotherapy and pharmacological therapy. Both cognitive behavioral therapy (CBT) and medications (e.g., SSRIs) have been shown to be effective in reducing anxiety. A combination of both CBT and medication is generally seen as the most desirable approach to treatment.

=== Psychotherapy ===
Psychotherapeutic interventions include a plurality of therapy types that vary based upon their specific methodologies for enabling individuals to gain insight into the working of the conscious and subconscious mind and which sometimes focus on the relationship between cognition and behavior. Cognitive behavioral therapy (CBT) is widely regarded as the first-line psychological therapy for treating GAD. Additionally, many of these psychological interventions may be delivered in an individual or group therapy setting. While individual and group settings are both considered effective for treating GAD, individual therapy tends to promote longer-lasting engagement (i.e., lower attrition over time).

For children, the role of the parent is important. They serve as co-therapists who ensure the therapists' tasks are implemented and provide children with positive reinforcement throughout the tasks. The "transfer of control" model highlights the growing responsibility of parents as the therapist's role fades.

==== Cognitive behavioral therapy ====
Cognitive behavioral therapy (CBT) is an evidence-based psychotherapy that has demonstrated efficacy in treating GAD and integrates cognitive and behavioral approaches. The objective of CBT is to enable individuals to identify irrational thoughts that cause anxiety and to challenge dysfunctional thinking patterns by engaging in awareness techniques such as hypothesis testing and journaling. Because CBT involves the practice of worry and anxiety management, CBT includes a plurality of intervention techniques that enable individuals to explore worry, anxiety, and automatic negative thinking patterns. These interventions include anxiety management training, cognitive restructuring, progressive relaxation, situational exposure and self-controlled desensitization. Several modes of delivery are effective in treating GAD, including internet-delivered CBT, or iCBT.

==== Psychodynamic therapy ====
Psychodynamic therapy is a type of therapy premised on Freudian psychology, in which a psychologist helps an individual explore elements of the subconscious mind to resolve conflicts between conscious and subconscious processes. In the context of GAD, the psychodynamic theory of anxiety suggests that the unconscious mind engages in worry as a defense mechanism to avoid feelings of anger or hostility because such feelings might cause social isolation or other negative attribution toward oneself. Accordingly, the various psychodynamic therapies attempt to explore the nature of worry as it functions in GAD to enable individuals to alter the subconscious practice of using worry as a defense mechanism and to thereby diminish GAD symptoms.

==== Exposure therapy ====
There is empirical evidence that exposure therapy can be an effective treatment for people with GAD, citing specifically in vivo exposure therapy (exposure through a real-life situation), which has greater effectiveness than imaginal exposure for generalized anxiety disorder. The aim of in vivo exposure treatment is to promote emotional regulation through systematic, controlled therapeutic exposure to traumatic stimuli. Exposure is used to promote fear tolerance.

Exposure therapy is also a preferred method for children who struggle with anxiety. Children typically prefer using a group format for exposure therapy treatment. This allows for peer learning and the opportunity to develop social skills.

==== Behavioral therapy ====
Behavioral therapy is a therapeutic intervention premised on the concept that anxiety is learned through classical conditioning (e.g., in response to one or more negative experiences) and maintained through operant conditioning (e.g., one finds that by avoiding a feared experience, one avoids anxiety). Thus, behavioral therapy enables an individual to re-learn conditioned responses (behaviors) and to thereby challenge behaviors that have become conditioned responses to fear and anxiety, and which have previously given rise to further maladaptive behaviors.

==== Cognitive therapy ====
Cognitive therapy (CT) is premised upon the idea that anxiety is the result of maladaptive beliefs and methods of thinking. Thus, CT involves assisting individuals in identifying more rational ways of thinking and replacing maladaptive thinking patterns (i.e., cognitive distortions) with healthier ones (e.g., replacing the cognitive distortion of catastrophizing with a more productive pattern of thinking). Individuals in CT learn to identify objective evidence, test hypotheses, and ultimately recognize maladaptive thinking patterns so these patterns can be challenged and replaced.

==== Acceptance and commitment therapy ====
Acceptance and commitment therapy (ACT) is a behavioral treatment based on acceptance-based models. ACT is designed with the purpose to target three therapeutic goals: (1) reduce the use of avoiding strategies intended to avoid feelings, thoughts, memories, and sensations; (2) decreasing a person's literal response to their thoughts (e.g., understanding that thinking "I'm hopeless" does not mean that the person's life is truly hopeless), and (3) increasing the person's ability to keep commitments to changing their behaviors. These goals are attained by switching the person's attempt to control events to working towards changing their behavior and focusing on valued directions and goals in their lives, as well as committing to behaviors that help the individual accomplish those personal goals. This psychological therapy teaches mindfulness (paying attention on purpose, in the present, and in a nonjudgmental manner) and acceptance (openness and willingness to sustain contact) skills for responding to uncontrollable events and therefore manifesting behaviors that enact personal values.

==== Intolerance of uncertainty therapy ====
Intolerance of uncertainty (IU) refers to a consistent negative reaction to uncertain or ambiguous events, regardless of their likelihood. Intolerance of uncertainty therapy (IUT) is used as a stand-alone treatment for GAD patients. Thus, IUT focuses on helping patients develop the ability to tolerate, cope with, and accept uncertainty in their lives to reduce anxiety. IUT is based on the psychological components of psychoeducation, awareness of worry, problem-solving training, re-evaluation of the usefulness of worry, virtual exposure imagery, recognition of uncertainty, and behavioral exposure. Studies have shown support for the efficacy of this therapy in GAD patients with continued improvements in follow-up periods.

==== Motivational interviewing ====
A promising innovative approach to improving recovery rates for the treatment of GAD is to combine CBT with motivational interviewing (MI). Motivational interviewing is a patient-centered strategy that aims to increase intrinsic motivation and reduce ambivalence about change related to treatment. MI contains four key elements: (1) express empathy, (2) heighten dissonance between behaviors that are not desired and values that are not consistent with those behaviors, (3) move with resistance rather than confrontation, and (4) encourage self-efficacy. It is based on asking open-ended questions and listening carefully and reflectively to patients' answers, eliciting "change talk", and talking with patients about the pros and cons of change. Some studies have shown that combining CBT with MI is more effective than CBT alone.

==== Emotion-focused therapy ====
Emotion-focused therapy (EFT) is a short-term psychotherapy that is focused on humanistic needs of emotions when treating individuals with GAD. EFT can incorporate numerous practices such as experiential therapy, systemic therapy, and elements of CBT to allow individuals to work through difficult emotional states. The primary goal of EFT is assisting individuals in living with their vulnerable emotions and overcoming avoidance so that adaptive experiences such as compassion and protective anger can be generated in response to the emotional needs that are embedded in core emotional vulnerability.

==== Sandplay therapy ====
Sandplay therapy (SPT) is an intervention based on nonverbal therapeutic practices. The main objective of SPT is to allow the individual the ability to work through their emotional problems from childhood traumas (CT) through play using sand and toy figures. Although the therapy is mainly focused on nonverbal cues, verbal cues are also observed and documented during the rehabilitation process of the individual. SPT allows a multi-sensory experience through a safe and protected space, allowing the individual the opportunity to regulate their mind and emotions. This therapeutic practice is offered to both adults and children.

==== Other forms of psychological therapy ====
- Relaxation techniques (e.g., relaxing imagery, meditational relaxation)
- Metacognitive therapy (MCT): The objective of MCT is to alter thinking patterns regarding worry so that worry is no longer used as a coping strategy. It has promising results in the treatment of GAD as well as other mental issues.
- Mindfulness-based stress reduction (MBSR)
- Mindfulness-based cognitive therapy (MBCT): The goal of MBCT is to be used as an alternative or adjunctive to Cognitive Behavior Therapy (CBT).
- Supportive therapy: This is a Rogerian method of therapy in which subjects experience empathy and acceptance from their therapist to facilitate increasing awareness. Variations of active supportive therapy include Gestalt therapy, transactional analysis and counseling.
- Internet-delivered interpretation training: The focus of this training is to reduce worry and anxiety while promoting positive outcomes and positive interpretations.

=== Pharmacotherapy ===
Medications that have been studied were reviewed in a recent network meta-analysis that compared all studied medications with placebo and also with each other and another compared the rates of remission between different medications. Benzodiazepines (BZs) have been used to treat anxiety starting in the 1960s. There is a risk of dependence and tolerance to benzodiazepines. BZs have a number of effects that make them a good option for treating anxiety including anxiolytic, hypnotic (sleep-inducing), muscle relaxant, anticonvulsant, and amnestic (impair short-term memory) properties. While BZs work well to alleviate anxiety shortly after administration, they are also known for their ability to promote dependence and are frequently used recreationally or non-medically. Antidepressants (e.g., SSRIs, SNRIs) have become a mainstay in treating GAD in adults. First-line medications from any drug category often include those that have been approved by the US Food and Drug Administration (FDA) or other similar regulatory body such as the EMA or TGA for treating GAD because these drugs have been shown to be safe and effective.

==== FDA-approved medications for treating GAD ====
FDA-approved medications for treating GAD include:

1. SSRIs
  1. Paroxetine
  2. Escitalopram
2. SNRIs
  1. Venlafaxine
  2. Duloxetine
3. Benzodiazepines
  1. Alprazolam
4. Azapirones
  1. Buspirone

==== Non-FDA approved medications ====
While certain medications are not specifically FDA approved for the treatment of GAD, several medications have historically been used or studied for treating GAD. Other medications that have been used or evaluated for treating GAD include:

- SSRIs
  - Citalopram
  - Fluoxetine
  - Sertraline
  - Fluvoxamine
- Benzodiazepines
  - Clonazepam
  - Lorazepam
  - Diazepam
- GABA analogs
  - Pregabalin
  - Tiagabine
- Second-generation antipsychotics
  - Olanzapine (modest benefit in SSRI-resistant GAD; weight gain risk)
  - Ziprasidone
  - Risperidone
  - Aripiprazole (studied as an adjunctive measure in concert with other treatment)
  - Quetiapine (atypical antipsychotic studied as an adjunctive measure in adults and geriatric patients)
- Antihistamines
  - Hydroxyzine (H_{1} receptor antagonist)
  - Mirtazapine (atypical antidepressant having 5-HT_{2A} and 5-HT_{2C} receptor affinity)
- Tricyclic antidepressants
  - Amitriptyline
  - Clomipramine
  - Doxepin
  - Imipramine
  - Trimipramine
  - Desipramine
  - Nortriptyline
  - Protriptyline
  - Opipramol (atypical TCA)
  - Trazodone
- Monoamine oxidase inhibitors (MAOIs)
  - Tranylcypromine
  - Phenelzine

==== Selective serotonin reuptake inhibitors ====
Pharmaceutical treatments for GAD include selective serotonin reuptake inhibitors (SSRIs). SSRIs increase serotonin levels through inhibition of serotonin reuptake receptors.

FDA approved SSRIs used for this purpose include escitalopram and paroxetine. However, guidelines suggest using sertraline first due to its cost-effectiveness compared to other SSRIs used for generalized anxiety disorder and a lower risk of withdrawal compared to SNRIs. If sertraline is found to be ineffective, then it is recommended to try another SSRI or SNRI.

Common side effects include nausea, sexual dysfunction, headache, diarrhea, constipation, restlessness, increased risk of suicide in young adults and adolescents, among others. Sexual side effects, weight gain, and higher risk of withdrawal are more common in paroxetine than in escitalopram and sertraline. In older populations or those taking concomitant medications that increase risk of bleeding, SSRIs may further increase the risk of bleeding. Overdose of an SSRI or concomitant use with another agent that causes increased levels of serotonin can result in serotonin syndrome, which can be life-threatening.

==== Serotonin norepinephrine reuptake inhibitors ====
First line pharmaceutical treatments for GAD also include serotonin–norepinephrine reuptake inhibitors (SNRIs). These inhibit the reuptake of serotonin and noradrenaline to increase their levels in the CNS.

FDA approved SNRIs used for this purpose include duloxetine (Cymbalta) and venlafaxine (Effexor). While SNRIs have similar efficacy as SSRIs, many psychiatrists prefer to use SSRIs first in the treatment of Generalized Anxiety Disorder. The slightly higher preference for SSRIs over SNRIs as a first choice for treatment of anxiety disorders may have been influenced by the observation of poorer tolerability of the SNRIs in comparison to SSRIs in systematic reviews of studies of depressed patients.

Side effects common to both SNRIs include anxiety, restlessness, nausea, weight loss, insomnia, dizziness, drowsiness, sweating, dry mouth, sexual dysfunction, and weakness. In comparison to SSRIs, the SNRIs have a higher prevalence of the side effects of insomnia, dry mouth, nausea, and high blood pressure. Both SNRIs have the potential for discontinuation syndrome after abrupt cessation, which can precipitate symptoms including motor disturbances and anxiety and may require tapering. Like other serotonergic agents, SNRIs have the potential to cause serotonin syndrome, a potentially fatal systemic response to serotonergic excess that causes symptoms including agitation, restlessness, confusion, tachycardia, hypertension, mydriasis, ataxia, myoclonus, muscle rigidity, diaphoresis, diarrhea, headache, shivering, goose bumps, high fever, seizures, arrhythmia and unconsciousness. SNRIs like SSRIs carry a black box warning for suicidal ideation, but it is generally considered that the risk of suicide in untreated depression is far higher than the risk of suicide when depression is properly treated.

==== Pregabalin and gabapentin ====
Pregabalin (Lyrica) is effective for treating GAD. It acts on the voltage-dependent calcium channel to decrease the release of neurotransmitters such as glutamate, norepinephrine and substance P. Its therapeutic effect appears after one week of use and is similar in effectiveness to lorazepam, alprazolam, and venlafaxine, but pregabalin has demonstrated superiority by producing more consistent therapeutic effects for psychic and somatic anxiety symptoms. Long-term trials have shown continued effectiveness without the development of tolerance and, additionally, unlike benzodiazepines, it does not disrupt sleep architecture and produces less severe cognitive and psychomotor impairment. It also has a low potential for misuse and dependency and may be preferred over the benzodiazepines for these reasons. The anxiolytic effects of pregabalin appear to persist for at least six months continuous use, suggesting tolerance is less of a concern; this gives pregabalin an advantage over certain anxiolytic medications such as benzodiazepines.

Gabapentin (Neurontin), a closely related medication to pregabalin with the same mechanism of action, has also demonstrated effectiveness in the treatment of GAD, though unlike pregabalin, it has not been approved specifically for this indication. Nonetheless, it is likely to be of similar usefulness in the management of this condition, and it has the advantage of being less expensive. In accordance, gabapentin is frequently prescribed off-label to treat GAD.

==== Complementary and alternative medicines studied for potential in treating GAD ====
Complementary and alternative medicines (CAMs) are widely used by individuals with GAD despite having no evidence or varied evidence regarding efficacy. Efficacy trials for CAM medications often have various types of bias and low quality reporting on safety. Regarding efficacy, critics point out that CAM trials sometimes predicate claims of efficacy based on a comparison of a CAM against a known drug after which no difference in subjects is found by investigators and which is used to suggest an equivalence between a CAM and a drug. Because this equates a lack of evidence with the positive assertion of efficacy, a "lack of difference" assertion is not a proper claim for efficacy. Moreover, an absence of strict definitions and standards for CAM compounds further burdens the literature regarding CAM efficacy in treating GAD. CAMs academically studied for their potential in treating GAD or GAD symptoms, along with a summary of academic findings, are given below. What follows is a summary of academic findings. Accordingly, none of the following should be taken as offering medical guidance or an opinion as to the safety or efficacy of any of the following CAMs.

1. Kava (Piper methysticum) extracts: Meta-analysis does not suggest efficacy of kava extracts due to the few data available, yielding inconclusive results or non-statistically significant results. Nearly a quarter (25.8%) of subjects experienced adverse effects (AEs) from Kava Kava extracts during six trials. Traditional kava is low-risk; solvent-based extracts or poor-quality forms may harm the liver.
2. Lavender (Lavandula angustifolia) extracts: Small and varied studies may suggest some level of efficacy as compared to placebo or other medication; claims of efficacy are regarded as needing further evaluation. Silexan is an oil derivative of Lavender studied in pediatric patients with GAD. Concern exists regarding whether Silexan may cause unopposed estrogen exposure in boys due to disruption of steroid signaling.
3. Galphimia glauca extracts: While Galphima glauca extracts have been the subject of two randomised controlled trials (RCTs) comparing Galphima glauca extracts to lorazepam, efficacy claims are regarded as "highly uncertain."
4. Chamomile (Matricaria chamomilla) extracts: Poor quality trials have trends that may suggest efficacy, but further study is needed to establish any claim of efficacy.
5. Crataegus oxycantha and Eschscholtzia californica extracts combined with magnesium: A single 12-week trial of Crataegus oxycantha and Eschscholtzia californica compared to placebo has been used to suggest efficacy. However, efficacy claims require confirmation studies. For the minority of subjects who experienced AEs from extracts, most AEs implicated gastrointestinal tract (GIT) intolerance.
6. Echium amoneum extract: A single, small trial used this extract as a supplement to fluoxetine (vs using a placebo to supplement fluoxetine); larger studies are needed to substantiate efficacy claims.
7. Gamisoyo-San: Small trials of this herbal mixture compared to placebo have suggested no efficacy of the herbal mixture over placebo, but further study is necessary to allow a definitive conclusion of a lack of efficacy.
8. Passiflora incarnata extract: Claims of efficacy or benzodiazepine equivalence are regarded as "highly uncertain."
9. Valeriana extract: A single 4-week trial suggests no effect of Valeriana extract on GAD but is regarded as "uninformative" on the topic of efficacy, given its finding that the benzodiazepine diazepam also had no effect. Further study may be warranted.

A 2022 meta-analysis found that some herbs—particularly lavender (Silexan), kava, Ginkgo biloba, and Withania somnifera—show promise for treating anxiety, though overall evidence remains preliminary due to small sample sizes and possible placebo effects.

==== Lifestyle ====
Lifestyle factors including: stress management, stress reduction, relaxation, sleep hygiene, and caffeine and alcohol reduction can influence anxiety levels. Physical activity has been shown to have a positive impact, whereas low physical activity may be a risk factor for anxiety disorders.

Engaging in physical activity appears to significantly reduce the risk of developing anxiety symptoms and disorders, though limitations in study quality and consistency highlight the need for further research.

=== Substances and GAD ===
Certain substances or the withdrawal from certain substances have been implicated in promoting the experience of anxiety. For example, even while benzodiazepines may afford individuals with GAD relief from anxiety, withdrawal from benzodiazepines is associated with the experience of anxiety among other adverse events like sweating and tremor.

Nicotine withdrawal symptoms may provoke anxiety in tobacco smokers and excessive caffeine use has been linked to aggravating and maintaining anxiety.

== Comorbidity ==
=== Depression ===
A longitudinal cohort study found 12% of 972 participants had GAD comorbid with major depressive disorder. Accumulating evidence indicates that patients with comorbid depression and anxiety tend to have greater illness severity and a lower treatment response than those with either disorder alone. In addition, social function and quality of life are more greatly impaired.

For many, the symptoms of both depression and anxiety are not severe enough (i.e., are subsyndromal) to justify a primary diagnosis of either major depressive disorder (MDD) or an anxiety disorder. However, dysthymia is the most prevalent comorbid diagnosis of GAD clients. Patients can also be categorized as having mixed anxiety–depressive disorder, though this is an unstable diagnosis that typically either goes away or shifts to a different diagnosis later on.

Various explanations for the high comorbidity between GAD and depressive disorders have been suggested, ranging from genetic pleiotropy (i.e., GAD and nonbipolar depression might represent different phenotypic expressions of a common etiology) to impaired executive control or sleep problems and fatigue as potential bridging mechanisms between the two disorders.

Both disorders are found to precede each other or help the other develop. In 32% of anxiety cases, depression was seen to begin before or concurrently, while in 37% of depression cases, anxiety was seen to begin before or concurrently. Within 72% of anxiety cases, a history of depression was found.

=== Comorbidity and treatment ===
Pharmacological approaches (i.e., the use of antidepressants) must be adapted for different comorbidities. For example, selective serotonin reuptake inhibitors (SSRIs) and benzodiazepines are used for depression and anxiety. However, for patients with anxiety and a substance use disorder, benzodiazepines should be used with caution due to their addictive properties.

Compared to the general population, patients with internalizing disorders such as depression, generalized anxiety disorder, and post-traumatic stress disorder (PTSD) have higher mortality rates, but die of the same age-related diseases as the population, such as heart disease, cerebrovascular disease, and cancer.

A comorbidity between GAD and attention deficit hyperactivity disorder (ADHD) has been observed. Anxiety disorders and major depressive disorder occur in a minority of individuals with ADHD, but more often than in the general population. Further research suggests that about 20 to 40 percent of individuals with ADHD have comorbid anxiety disorders, with GAD being the most prevalent.

Those with GAD have a lifetime comorbidity prevalence of 30% to 35% with alcohol use disorder and 25% to 30% for another substance use disorder. People with both GAD and a substance use disorder also have a higher lifetime prevalence for other comorbidities. A study found that GAD was the primary disorder in slightly more than half of the 18 participants that were comorbid with alcohol use disorder.

== Epidemiology ==
GAD is often estimated to affect approximately 3–6% of adults and 5% of children and adolescents. Although estimates have varied to suggest a GAD prevalence of 3% in children and 10.8% in adolescents. When GAD manifests in children and adolescents, it typically begins around 8 to 9 years of age.

Estimates regarding prevalence of GAD or lifetime risk (i.e., lifetime morbid risk [LMR]) for GAD vary depending upon which criteria are used for diagnosing GAD (e.g., DSM-5 vs ICD-10) although estimates do not vary widely between diagnostic criteria. In general, ICD-10 is more inclusive than DSM-5, so estimates regarding prevalence and lifetime risk tend to be greater using ICD-10. Regarding prevalence, in a given year, about two (2%) percent of adults in the United States and Europe have been suggested to have GAD. However, the risk of developing GAD at any point in life has been estimated at 9.0%. Although it is possible to experience a single episode of GAD during one's life, most people who experience GAD experience it repeatedly over the course of their lives as a chronic or ongoing condition. GAD is diagnosed twice as frequently in women as in men and is more often diagnosed in those who are separated, divorced, unemployed, widowed or have low levels of education, and among those with low socioeconomic status. African Americans have higher odds of having GAD and the disorder often manifests itself in different patterns. It has been suggested that greater prevalence of GAD in women may be because women are more likely than men to live in poverty, are more frequently the subject of discrimination, and be sexually and physically abused more often than men. Regarding the first incidence of GAD in an individual's life course, a first manifestation of GAD usually occurs between the late teenage years and the early twenties with the median age of onset being approximately 31 and mean age of onset being 32.7. However, GAD can begin or reoccur at any point in life. Indeed, GAD is common in the elderly population.

=== United States ===
United States: Approximately 3.1 percent of people age 18 and over in a given year (9.5 million).

=== UK ===
5.9 percent of adults were affected by GAD in 2019.

=== Other ===
- Australia: 3 percent of adults
- Canada: 2.5 percent
- Italy: 2.9 percent
- Taiwan: 0.4 percent

== History ==
The American Psychiatric Association introduced GAD as a diagnosis in the DSM-III in 1980, when anxiety neurosis was split into GAD and panic disorder. The definition in the DSM-III required uncontrollable and diffuse anxiety or worry that is excessive and unrealistic and persists for one month or longer. High rates in comorbidity of GAD and major depression led many commentators to suggest that GAD would be better conceptualized as an aspect of major depression instead of an independent disorder. Many critics stated that the diagnostic features of this disorder were not well established until the DSM-III-R. Since the comorbidity of GAD and other disorders decreased with time, the DSM-III-R changed the time requirement for a GAD diagnosis to six months or longer. The DSM-IV changed the definition of excessive worry and the number of associated psychophysiological symptoms required for a diagnosis.

Another aspect of the diagnosis the DSM-IV clarified was what constitutes a symptom as occurring "often". The DSM-IV also required difficulty controlling the worry to be diagnosed with GAD. The DSM-5 emphasized that excessive worrying had to occur more days than not and on several different topics. It has been stated that the constant changes in the diagnostic features of the disorder have made assessing epidemiological statistics such as prevalence and incidence difficult, as well as increasing the difficulty for researchers in identifying the biological and psychological underpinnings of the disorder. Consequently, making specialized medications for the disorder is more difficult as well. This has led to the continuation of GAD being medicated heavily with SSRIs.

== See also ==
- Daily Assessment of Symptoms – Anxiety
- Mental health
- Mental health professional
- List of investigational anxiolytics
- Journal therapy
