= Noe (surname) =

- Pronunciation: English: /ˈnoʊ.i/; Korean: /nwe/
- Language: Dutch, English, French, German, Korean, others

Origin
- Origin: European languages: the biblical name Noah; Korean: the Chinese surnames Lei and Lai

Other names
- Variant forms: English: Noy; Korean: Noi, Roe, Roi

Noe is a surname in various European countries originating from the given name Noah, as well as a rare Korean surname meaning "thunder".

== Origins ==
As a Dutch, English, French, and German surname, Noe is derived from the biblical given name Noah (Middle English and Latin Noe). Other surnames with the same derivation include the English variant Noy, as well as Noa and Nohe. The spelling Noè usually originates from the Italian form of the given name Noah, while the spelling Noé usually originates from the French form, but in many cases, descendants in other countries have dropped the diacritics. Occasionally, the ancestors of some modern-day bearers of the surname had instead derived it from the given name Noël, or as a toponymic surname from Noé, Haute-Garonne, France. Noah was not a common given name in medieval England when the surname first appeared there, and so Patrick Hanks suggests that the surname may have been used by descendants of people who were nicknamed Noah, for example as a jocular reference to the Genesis flood narrative, or because they had played the part of Noah in a stage play.

As a Korean surname, Noe (Korean: 뇌) can be written with either of two hanja characters: one meaning "thunder" (雷; Korean: 우레 뇌; RR: Ure Noe), and the other meaning "to request" (賴; Korean: 의뢰할 뇌; RR: Uiroehal Noe). In North Korea, both of these surnames are still spelled Roe (뢰), but in South Korea, the spelling of Sino-Korean words starting with 'r' has changed. The first character is used to write the Chinese surname now pronounced Léi in Mandarin Chinese, while the second is used to write the surname Lài. In Korea, surnames are also divided by identification with bon-gwan, which are hometowns of a clan lineage. The main bon-gwan for the surname Noe meaning "thunder" is Gyodong-myeon, a township and island in Ganghwa County, Incheon. However, in the 1930 colonial census, most of the households with the surname Noe resided in Hwanghae Province (34 households), with the remaining six households being in South Pyongan (5) and Chungcheongnamdo (1). Its members claim descent from Noe I-seong (Korean: 뇌이성; Hanja: 雷以誠; pinyin: Léi Yǐchéng), who came from China to Korea to take the official post of hyeongbu sirang during the reign of Emperor Dezong of Qing in the late 19th century.

== Statistics ==
In Italy, 426 families bore the surname Noe, with 197 (46.2%) located in Lombardy, 49 (11.5%) in Piedmont, and 42 (9.9%) in Veneto.

In the Netherlands, there were 184 people with the surname Noë as of 2007, up from 175 in 1947.

In South Korea, the 2000 census found 80 people in 26 households with the surname Noe meaning "thunder", all but two of whom identified with the Gyodong bon-gwan. There were also 12 people in two households with the surname Noe meaning "to request", but the census did not record their bon-gwan. Statistics for the current distribution of these surnames in North Korea are not available. A 1930 taxation survey by the Japanese colonial government found roughly thirty households with the surname meaning "thunder", primarily in Suan County and Hwangju County, North Hwanghae province (in an area that became part of North Korea after the division of Korea).

The 2010 United States census found 11,182 people with the surname Noe, making it the 3,229th-most-common name in the country. This represented an increase in absolute numbers, but a decrease in relative proportion, from 10,789 (3,080th-most-common) in the 2000 Census. In both censuses, more than 90% of the bearers of the surname identified as White, between three and five per cent as Hispanic, and between one and two percent as Asian.

== People ==
=== Humanities ===
- Yvan Noé (1895–1963), French playwright
- Kenneth W. Noe (born 1957), American historian
- Alva Noë (born 1964), American philosophy professor
- Ian Noe (born 1990), American musician
- Katherine Schlick Noe, American education professor
- Mary Noe, American educator, writer and lecturer
- Constantin Noe (1883–1939), Megleno-Romanian editor and professor

=== Politics ===
- José de Jesús Noé (1805–1862), the last Mexican alcalde of Yerba Buena, now San Francisco
- Giovanni Noè (1866–1908), Italian lawyer, anarchist, and politician
- James A. Noe (1890–1976), American politician from Louisiana
- Cindy Noe (born 1947), American politician from Indiana
- Thomas Noe (born 1954), American politician from Ohio

=== Science and medicine ===
- Friedrich Wilhelm Noë (1798–1858), German-born Austrian pharmacist
- Adolf Carl Noé (1873–1939), Austrian-born palaeobotanist
- Jerre Noe (1923–2005), American computer scientist
- Joel Mark Noe (1943–1991), American plastic surgeon

=== Sport ===
- Chuck Noe (1924–2003), American basketball coach
- Chet Noe (1931–2025), American basketball player
- Anne Noë (born 1959), Belgian football coach
- Marc Noë (born 1962), Belgian footballer and later manager
- Ángel Noé Alayón (born 1964), Colombian cyclist
- Andrea Noè (born 1969), Italian road bicycle racer
- Jacob Noe (born 1980), American mixed martial artist
- Guilherme Noé (1992–2021), Brazilian footballer
- Bálint Noé (born 1993), Hungarian canoeist

=== Visual arts ===
- Amédée de Noé (1818–1879), French caricaturist and lithographer
- Luis Felipe Noé (1933–2025), Argentine artist and writer
- Gaspar Noé (born 1963), Argentine filmmaker
- Ignacio Noé (born 1965), Argentine graphic artist
- Rémy Noë (born 1974), British painter

=== Other ===
- Sydney P. Noe (1885–1969), American numismatist
- Ana María Noé (1914–1970), Spanish actress
- Virgilio Noè (1922–2011), Italian Catholic prelate
- Marie Noe (1928–2016), American woman convicted of murdering eight of her children
- Clifford Noe (1930–2004), American conman
- Arvid Noe (1946–1976), pseudonym of a Norwegian man who died due to AIDS
- Leo Noe (born 1953), British real estate investor
- Kevin Noe (born 1969), American conductor and stage director
- Tankeu Noé (?–1964), Cameroonian guerrilla

== See also ==
- Noe (disambiguation)
- Noë
