= Noë =

Noë is a surname.

- Alva Noë (born 1964), American philosopher
- Anne Noë (born 1959), Belgian football coach and former international goalkeeper
- Friedrich Wilhelm Noë (1798 – 1858), German-born, Austrian pharmacist and botanist
- Marc Noë (born 1962), Belgian football manager and former player
- Rémy Noë (born 1974), British painter

== See also ==
- Arca Noë, book published in 1675 by the Jesuit scholar Athanasius Kircher
- Noë Dussenne (born 1992), Belgian professional footballer
- Noë Bloch (1875–1937), Russian-born film producer
- Noe (surname)
