= Noe (given name) =

Noe, Noé, Noè or Noë is a masculine given name, a form of Noah, that may refer to the following people:

- Noé Acosta (born 1983), Spanish football midfielder
- Noé Alonzo (born 1983), Mexican basketball player
- Noe Balvin (born 1930), Colombian sport shooter
- Noé Barrueta (born 1971), Mexican politician
- Noë Bloch (1875–1937), Russian-born film producer
- Noè Bordignon (1841–1920), Italian painter
- Noé Chevrier (1846–1911), Canadian clothier, furrier and politician
- Noé Delpech (born 1986), French sailor
- Noé Duchaufour-Lawrance (born 1974), French interior architect and designer
- Noë Dussenne (born 1992), Belgian football player
- Noé de la Flor Casanova (1904–1986), Mexican lawyer, singer, songwriter, writer, poet and politician
- Noé Gianetti (born 1989), Swiss cyclist
- Noé González Alcoba (born 1979), Uruguayan boxer
- Noé Hernández (disambiguation)
- Noé Jitrik (1928–2022), Argentine literary critic
- Noe Khlif (born 1998), French pickleball player
- Noe Khomeriki (1883–1924), Georgian politician
- Noé Kwin (born 1990), Cameroonian football defender
- Noé Martín Vázquez (born 1970), Mexican politician
- Noé Maya (born 1985), Mexican football midfielder
- Noé Medina (born 1943), Ecuadorian cyclist
- Noe Muñoz (born 1967), Mexican baseball catcher
- Noé Murayama (1930–1997), Mexican actor
- Noe Näff (born 2003), Swiss cross-country skier
- Noé Pamarot (born 1979), French football defender
- Noe Ramirez (disambiguation)
- Noe Ramishvili (1881–1930), Georgian politician
- Noe Rinonos (born 1942), Filipino weightlifter
- Noé Roth (born 2000), Swiss freestyle skier
- Noé Sissoko (born 1983), Malian football midfielder
- Noe Venable (born 1976), North American folk singer
- Noé Willer, French singer
- Noe Zhordania (1868–1953), Georgian politician and journalist
