= José de la Cruz =

José de la Cruz may refer to:

- José de la Cruz (writer) (1746–1829), Filipino writer
- José de la Cruz Sánchez (1749–1878), Californio statesman and ranchero
- José María de la Cruz (1799–1875), Chilean soldier
- José de la Cruz Porfirio Díaz Mor (1830–1915), better known as Porfirio Díaz, Mexican President
- José de la Cruz Mena (1874–1907), Nicaraguan composer
- José de la Cruz (footballer) (born 1952), Paraguayan football goalkeeper
- José Luis de la Cruz (born 2000), Dominican football right-back

== See also ==
- Jose Cruz (disambiguation)
