= Libby Zion Law =

New York state statute

New York State Department of Health Code, Section 405, also known as the Libby Zion Law, is a regulation that limits the amount of resident physicians' work in New York State hospitals to roughly 80 hours per week. The law was named after Libby Zion, the daughter of author Sidney Zion, who died in 1984 at the age of 18. Sidney blamed Libby's death on overworked resident physicians and intern physicians. In July 2003, the Accreditation Council for Graduate Medical Education adopted similar regulations for all accredited medical training institutions in the United States.

Although regulatory and civil proceedings found conflicting evidence about Zion's death, today, her death is widely believed to have been caused by serotonin syndrome from the drug interaction between the phenelzine she was taking prior to her hospital visit, and the pethidine administered by a resident physician. The lawsuits and regulatory investigations following her death, and their implications for working conditions and supervision of interns and residents, were highly publicized in both lay media and medical journals.

== Death of Libby Zion ==
Libby Zion (November 1965 – March 5, 1984) was a freshman at Bennington College in Bennington, Vermont. She took a prescribed MAOI antidepressant, phenelzine, daily. A hospital autopsy revealed traces of cocaine, but other later tests showed no traces. She was the daughter of Sidney Zion, a lawyer who had been a writer for The New York Times, and Elsa Zion, a city official and former publishing executive. Her obituary in The New York Times, written the day after her death, stated that she had been ill with a "flu-like ailment" for the past several days. The article stated that after being admitted to New York Hospital, she died of cardiac arrest, the cause of which was not known.

Libby Zion had been admitted to the hospital through the emergency room by the resident physician assigned to the ER on the night of March 4. Raymond Sherman, the Zion family physician, agreed with their plan to hydrate and observe her. Zion was assigned to two residents, Luise Weinstein and Gregg Stone, who both evaluated her. Weinstein, a first-year resident physician (also referred to as intern or PGY-1), and Stone, a PGY-2 resident, were unable to determine the cause of Zion's illness, though Stone tentatively suggested that her condition might be a simple overreaction to a normal illness. After consulting with Dr. Sherman, the two prescribed pethidine (meperidine) to control the "strange jerking motions" that Zion had been exhibiting when she was admitted.

Weinstein and Stone were both responsible for covering dozens of other patients. After evaluating Zion, they left. Luise Weinstein went to cover other patients, and Stone went to sleep in an on-call room in an adjacent building. Zion, however, did not improve, and continued to become more agitated. After being contacted by nurses by phone, Weinstein ordered medical restraints be placed on Zion. She also prescribed haloperidol by phone to control the agitation. Zion finally managed to fall asleep, but by 6:30, her temperature had soared to 107 °F (42 °C). Weinstein was once again called, and measures were quickly taken to try to reduce her temperature, but Zion had a cardiac arrest and could not be resuscitated.

Several years later, physicians concluded the combination of phenelzine and the pethidine given to her by Stone and Weinstein contributed to the development of serotonin syndrome, which led to increased agitation. This led Zion to pull on her intravenous catheter, causing Weinstein to order physical restraints, which Zion also fought against. By the time she finally fell asleep, her fever had already reached dangerous levels, and she died soon after of cardiac arrest.

== Publicity and trials ==
Zion's parents became convinced their daughter's death was due to inadequate hospital staffing. Sidney Zion questioned the staff's competence for two reasons. The first was the administration of pethidine, which can cause fatal interactions with phenelzine, the antidepressant that Zion was taking. Few clinicians knew of this interaction at the time, though it is now widely known because of this case. The second issue was the use of restraints and emergency psychiatric medication. Sidney referred to Libby's death as a "murder", and wrote "They gave her a drug that was destined to kill her, then ignored her except to tie her down like a dog." Sidney also questioned the long hours that residents worked at the time. In a New York Times op-ed piece, he wrote: "You don't need kindergarten to know that a resident working a 36-hour shift is in no condition to make any kind of judgment call—forget about life-and-death." The case eventually became a protracted high-profile legal battle, with multiple abrupt reversals. Case reports about it appeared in major medical journals.

=== State investigation ===
In May 1986, Manhattan District Attorney Robert Morgenthau agreed to let a grand jury consider murder charges, an unusual decision for a medical malpractice case. Although the jury declined to indict for murder, in 1987 the intern and resident were charged with 38 counts of gross negligence and/or gross incompetence. The grand jury considered that a series of mistakes contributed to Zion's death, including the improper prescription of drugs and the failure to perform adequate diagnostic tests. Under New York law, the investigative body for these charges was the Hearing Committee of the State Board for Professional Medical Conduct. Between April 1987 and January 1989, the committee conducted 30 hearings at which 33 witnesses testified, including expert witnesses in toxicology, emergency medicine, and chairmen of internal medicine departments at six prominent medical schools, several of whom stated under oath that they had never heard of the interaction between pethidine and phenelzine prior to this case. At the end of these proceedings, the committee unanimously decided that none of the 38 charges against the two residents were supported by evidence. Its findings were accepted by the full board, and by the state's Health Commissioner, David Axelrod.

Under New York law, however, the final decision in this matter rested with another body, the Board of Regents, which was under no obligation to consider either the Commissioner's or the Hearing Committee's recommendations. The Board of Regents, which at the time had only one physician among its 16 members, voted to "censure and reprimand" the resident physicians for acts of gross negligence. This decision did not affect their right to practice. The verdict against the two residents was considered very surprising in medical circles. In no other case had the Board of Regents overruled the Commissioner's recommendation. The hospital also admitted it had provided inadequate care and paid a $13,000 fine to the state. In 1991, however, the state's appeals court completely cleared the records of the two doctors of findings that they had provided inadequate care to Zion.

=== Civil trial ===
In parallel with the state investigation, Sidney Zion also filed a separate civil case against the doctors and the hospital. The civil trial came to a close in 1995 when a Manhattan jury found that the two residents and Libby Zion's primary care doctor contributed to her death by prescribing the wrong drug, and ordered them to pay a total of $375,000 to Zion's family for her pain and suffering. The jury also found that Raymond Sherman, the primary care physician, had lied on the witness stand in denying he knew that Libby Zion was to be given pethidine. Although the jury found the three doctors negligent, none of them was found guilty of "wanton" negligence, i.e., demonstrating utter disregard for the patient, as opposed to a simple mistake. Payouts for wanton negligence would not have been covered by the doctors' malpractice insurance.

The emergency room physician, Maurice Leonard, as well as the hospital (as legal persona) were found not responsible for Zion's death in the civil trial. The jury decided that the hospital was negligent for leaving Weinstein alone in charge of 40 patients that night, but they also concluded that this negligence did not directly contribute to Zion's death. The trial was shown on Court TV.

== Law and regulations ==
After the grand jury's indictment of the two residents, Axelrod decided to address the systemic problems in residency by establishing a blue-ribbon panel of experts headed by Bertrand M. Bell, a primary care physician at the Albert Einstein College of Medicine in the Bronx. Bell was well known for his critical stance regarding the lack of supervision of physicians-in-training. Formally known as the Ad Hoc Advisory Committee on Emergency Services, and more commonly known as the Bell Commission, the committee evaluated the training and supervision of doctors in the state, and developed a series of recommendations that addressed several patient-care issues, including restraint usage, medication systems, and resident work hours.

The Bell Commission recommendations that attending physicians should be present at all times and limiting residents to 80 hours a week and 24 hours at a time were adopted by New York in 1989. Implementation of the recommendations caused some hospitals to introduce doctors who worked overnight to spell their colleagues. Periodic follow-up audits have prompted the New York State Department of Health to crack down on violating hospitals. Similar limits have since been adopted in numerous other states. In July 2003, the Accreditation Council for Graduate Medical Education (ACGME) adopted similar regulations for all accredited medical training institutions in the United States.

== See also ==
- "Prescription for Death", first episode of Law & Order, based on Zion case
- Law of New York
