= Noe =

Noe may refer to:

== Places ==
- Noé, Haute-Garonne, France, a commune
- Noé, Yonne, France, a commune
- Noé, Ivory Coast, a town
- River Noe, Derbyshire, England
- Noe Woods, University of Wisconsin–Madison Arboretum, Madison, Wisconsin

== People ==
- Noe (given name), a list of people
- Noe (surname), including a list of people
- NOE (rapper), American rapper

== NOE ==
- Nuclear Overhauser effect
- Nap-of-the-earth flight
- Network of Excellence
- Nintendo of Europe
- Neoproterozoic oxygenation event, a geologic time interval between around 850 and 540 million years ago

== Other uses ==
- Noe Station, Osaka, Japan, on the Keihan Main Line
- Noe Middle School, Louisville, Kentucky
- Noé (opera), by Fromental Halévy, completed by Georges Bizet
- Noé, a play by André Obey
- Noah, a biblical figure, spelled Noé, Noè, Noë, or Noe in several languages, as well as formerly in English
- NOE, IATA airport code for Norden-Norddeich Airfield in Germany

== See also ==
- Noe Valley, San Francisco, a city neighborhood
