= Jose Cruz =

José Cruz (born 1947) is a former Puerto Rican baseball player.

Jose Cruz may also refer to:

- Jose B. Cruz Jr. (born 1932), Filipino engineer
- José E. Cruz (born 1984), Dominican Republic baseball player
- José Cruz (Honduran footballer) (born 1949), Honduran footballer
- Jose Cruz (Oklahoma politician), American member of the Oklahoma House of Representatives
- José Cruz (Spanish footballer) (born 1988), Spanish footballer
- José Cruz Delgado (1912–1960), Chilean trade union leader and politician
- José Cruz Jr. (born 1974), Puerto Rican baseball player
- José de la Cruz (1746–1829), Filipino writer
- José Luis Cruz Cruz (born 1959), Puerto Rican politician and mayor of Trujillo Alto
- José Luis Cruz Flores Gómez (born 1957), Mexican politician
- José da Cruz Cardinal Policarpo (1936–2014), Portuguese Roman Catholic archbishop
- José Monje Cruz, birth name of Camarón de la Isla (1950–1992), Spanish Romani flamenco singer
- Jose V. Cruz (1926–1998), Filipino diplomat and writer

== See also ==
- José Guadalupe Cruz (disambiguation)
- José Santa Cruz (disambiguation)
