= Richard Pillard =

American psychiatrist

Richard Colestock Pillard (born 11 October 1933) is a professor of psychiatry at the Boston University School of Medicine. He was the first openly gay psychiatrist in the United States.

== Early life and family ==
Pillard was born in Springfield, Ohio. He briefly attended Swarthmore College before transferring to Antioch College, where his father Basil H. Pillard was an English professor. Pillard received his B.A. from Antioch.

Chandler Burr reported that Pillard jokes "he is uniquely equipped to investigate whether homosexuality has a biological basis: he, his brother, and his sister are gay, and Pillard believes that his father may have been gay. One of Pillard's three daughters from a marriage early in life is bisexual. This family history seems to invite a biological explanation, and it made Pillard start thinking about the origins of sexual orientation."

He and biologist James D. Weinrich co-authored a paper which found that homosexuality runs in some families.

== Publications ==
- Lane HL, Pillard RC, Hedberg U (2011). The People of the Eye: Deaf Ethnicity and Ancestry. Oxford University Press US, ISBN 978-0-19-975929-3
- Dawood, K; Pillard, RC; Horvath, C; Revelle, W; Bailey, JM (Apr 2000). "Familial aspects of male homosexuality". Arch Sex Behav. 29 (2): 155–63. PMID 10842723.
- Bailey, JM; Pillard, RC; Dawood, K; Miller, MB; Farrer, LA; Trivedi, S; Murphy, RL (Mar 1999). "A family history study of male sexual orientation using three independent samples". Behav Genet. 29 (2): 79–86. doi:10.1023/A:1021652204405. PMID 10405456.
- Pillard, RC; Bailey, JM (Apr 1998). "Human sexual orientation has a heritable component". Hum Biol. 70 (2): 347–65. PMID 9549243.
- Pillard, RC; Bailey, JM (Mar 1995). "A biologic perspective on sexual orientation". Psychiatr Clin North Am. 18 (1): 71–84. PMID 7761309.
- Snyder, PJ; Weinrich, JD; Pillard, RC (Aug 1994). "Personality and lipid level differences associated with homosexual and bisexual identity in men". Arch Sex Behav. 23 (4): 433–51. PMID 7993184.
- Pillard, RC; Rosen, LR; Meyer-Bahlburg, H; et al. (1993). "Psychopathology and social functioning in men prenatally exposed to diethylstilbestrol (DES)". Psychosom Med. 55: 485–91. PMID 8310108.
- Bailey, JM; Pillard, RC; Neale, MC; Agyei, Y (Mar 1993). "Heritable factors influence sexual orientation in women". Arch Gen Psychiatry. 50 (3): 217–23. PMID 8439243.
- Weinrich, JD; Snyder, PJ; Pillard, RC; Grant, I; Jacobson, DL; Robinson, SR; McCutchan, JA (Apr 1993). "A factor analysis of the Klein sexual orientation grid in two disparate samples". Arch Sex Behav. 22 (2): 157–68. PMID 8476335.
- Bailey, JM; Pillard, RC (Dec 1991). "A genetic study of male sexual orientation". Arch Gen Psychiatry. 48 (12): 1089–96. PMID 1845227.
- Tuttle, GE; Pillard, RC (Jun 1991). "Sexual orientation and cognitive abilities". Arch Sex Behav. 20 (3): 307–18. PMID 2059149.
- Pillard, RC; Weinrich, JD (Aug 1986). "Evidence of familial nature of male homosexuality". Arch Gen Psychiatry. 43 (8): 808–12. PMID 3729676.
- Pillard, RC; Poumadere, J; Carretta, RA (Dec 1982). "A family study of sexual orientation". Arch Sex Behav. 11 (6): 511–20. PMID 6760832.
- Pillard, RC; Poumadere, J; Carretta, RA (Oct 1981). "Is homosexuality familial? A review, some data, and a suggestion". Arch Sex Behav. 10 (5): 465–75. PMID 7032464.
- Lane HL, Pillard RC (1978). The Wild Boy of Burundi: a study of an outcast child. Random House, ISBN 978-0-394-41252-8
- Pillard, RC; Fisher, S (1975). "Chlordiazepoxide and phenobarbital in a model anxiety-inducing situation". Compr Psychiatry. 16: 97–101. PMID 1109838.
- Pillard, RC; McNair, DM; Fisher, S (1974). "Does marijuana enhance experimentally induced anxiety?". Psychopharmacologia. 40 (3): 205–10. PMID 4445449.
- Pillard, RC; Rose, RM; Sherwood, M (Sep 1974). "Plasma testosterone levels in homosexual men". Arch Sex Behav. 3 (5): 453–8. PMID 4415098.
- Pillard, RC (Mar 1973). "Shall we allow heroin maintenance?". N Engl J Med. 288 (13): 682–3. doi:10.1056/NEJM197303292881311. PMID 4687260.
- Pillard, RC (Apr 1971). "Authors and editors: mutual responsibility". Am J Psychiatry. 127 (10): 1420–1. PMID 5549943.
- Meyer, RE; Pillard, RC; Shapiro, LM; Mirin, SM (Aug 1971). "Administration of marijuana to heavy and casual marijuana users". Am J Psychiatry. 128 (2): 198–204. PMID 4939591.
- Mirin, SM; Shapiro, LM; Meyer, RE; Pillard, RC; Fisher, S (Mar 1971). "Casual versus heavy use of marijuana: a redefinition of the marijuana problem". Am J Psychiatry. 127 (9): 1134–40. PMID 5100604.
- Pillard, RC (August 1970). "Marihuana". N. Engl. J. Med. 283: 294–303. doi:10.1056/NEJM197008062830606. PMID 4913364.
- Pillard, RC; Fisher, S (Jun 1970). "Aspects of anxiety in dental clinic patients". J Am Dent Assoc. 80 (6): 1331–4. PMID 5266124.
- Pillard, RC; Fisher, S (1967). "Effects of chlordiazepoxide and secobarbital on film-induced anxiety". Psychopharmacologia. 12 (1): 18–23. PMID 6081323.
- McNair, DM; Droppleman, LF; Pillard, RC (Jan 1967). "Differential sensitivity of two palmar sweat measures". Psychophysiology. 3 (3): 280–4. PMID 5341532.
- Globus, GG; Pillard, RC (Fall 1966). "Tausk's Influencing Machine and Kafka's In the Penal Colony". Am Imago. 23 (3): 191–207. PMID 5334128.
