= Serotonin syndrome =

Symptoms caused by an excess of serotonin in the central nervous system

- Other names: Serotonin toxicity, serotonin toxidrome, serotonin sickness, serotonin storm, serotonin poisoning, hyperserotonemia, serotonergic syndrome, serotonin shock
- Serotonin
- Specialty: Emergency medicine, psychiatry, toxicology, neurology
- Symptoms: High body temperature, agitation, hallucinations, increased reflexes, tremors, sweating, dilated pupils, diarrhea
- Usual onset: Within a day
- Causes: Selective serotonin reuptake inhibitor (SSRI), serotonin–norepinephrine reuptake inhibitor (SNRI), monoamine oxidase inhibitor (MAOI), tricyclic antidepressants (TCAs), amphetamine, methylene blue, pethidine (meperidine), tramadol, dextromethorphan, ondansetron, cocaine
- Diagnostic method: Based on symptoms and medication use
- Differential diagnosis: Neuroleptic malignant syndrome, malignant hyperthermia, anticholinergic toxicity, heat stroke, meningitis
- Treatment: Active cooling
- Medication: Benzodiazepines, cyproheptadine
- Frequency: Unknown

Serotonin syndrome (SS) consists of a group of symptoms that may occur with the use of certain serotonergic medications or drugs. The symptoms can range from mild to severe, and are potentially fatal. Symptoms in mild cases include high blood pressure and a fast heart rate, usually without a fever. Symptoms in moderate cases include high body temperature, agitation, overactive reflexes, tremor, sweating, dilated pupils, and diarrhea. In severe cases, body temperature can increase to greater than 41.1 °C (106.0 °F). Complications may include seizures and extensive muscle breakdown.

Serotonin syndrome is typically caused by the use of two or more serotonergic medications or drugs. These may include selective serotonin reuptake inhibitors (SSRIs), serotonin–norepinephrine reuptake inhibitors (SNRIs), monoamine oxidase inhibitors (MAOIs), tricyclic antidepressants (TCAs), amphetamines, pethidine (meperidine), tramadol, dextromethorphan, buspirone, L-tryptophan, 5-hydroxytryptophan, St. John's wort, triptans, MDMA, metoclopramide, or cocaine. It occurs in about 15% of SSRI overdoses. It is a predictable consequence of excess serotonin on the central nervous system. Onset of symptoms is typically within a day of the extra serotonin.

Diagnosis is based on a person's symptoms and history of medication use. Other conditions that can produce similar symptoms such as neuroleptic malignant syndrome, malignant hyperthermia, anticholinergic toxicity, heat stroke, and meningitis should be ruled out. As of 2013, no laboratory tests exist that can confirm the diagnosis.

Initial treatment consists of discontinuing medications which may be contributing. In those who are agitated, benzodiazepines may be used. If this is not sufficient, a serotonin antagonist such as cyproheptadine may be used. In those with a high body temperature, active cooling measures may be needed. The number of cases of serotonin syndrome that occur each year is unclear. With appropriate medical intervention the risk of death is low, likely less than 1%. The high-profile case of Libby Zion, who is generally accepted to have died from serotonin syndrome, resulted in changes to graduate medical school education in New York State.

== Signs and symptoms ==
Clonus seen in a person with serotonin syndrome

Symptom onset is usually relatively rapid, and serotonin syndrome encompasses a wide range of clinical findings. Mild symptoms may consist of increased heart rate, shivering, sweating, dilated pupils, and myoclonus (intermittent jerking or twitching), as well as hyperreflexia (overresponsive reflexes). Many of these symptoms may be side effects of the drug or drug interaction causing excessive levels of serotonin rather than an effect of elevated serotonin itself.

Tremor is a common side effect of MDMA's action on dopamine, whereas hyperreflexia is symptomatic of exposure to serotonin agonists. Moderate intoxication includes additional abnormalities such as hyperactive bowel sounds, high blood pressure and hyperthermia; a temperature as high as 40 °C (104 °F). The overactive reflexes and clonus in moderate cases may be greater in the lower limbs than in the upper limbs. Mental changes include hypervigilance or insomnia and agitation. Severe symptoms include severe increases in heart rate and blood pressure. Temperature may rise to above 41.1 °C (106.0 °F) in life-threatening cases. Other abnormalities include metabolic acidosis, rhabdomyolysis, seizures, kidney failure, and disseminated intravascular coagulation; these effects usually arising as a consequence of hyperthermia.

The symptoms are often present as a clinical triad of abnormalities and can be used to assess the severity of serotonin syndrome:

Serotonin syndrome severity assessment scale
Severity	Autonomic effects	Neurological (somatic) signs	Mental status	Other symptoms
mild	absent or low-grade fever; tachycardia; mydriasis; excessive sweating; shivering	intermittent tremor; akathisia; myoclonus (muscle twitching); mild hyperreflexia	restlessness; anxiety	
moderate	increased tachycardia; fever up to 41 °C; nausea; diarrhea; hyperactive bowel sounds; excessive sweating; vasoconstriction	moderate hyperreflexia; inducible clonus; ocular clonus (slow continuous eye movements); myoclonus	easily induced startle response; confusion; agitation; hypervigilance	rhabdomyolysis; metabolic acidosis; renal failure; disseminated intravascular coagulopathy
severe	temperature higher than 41 °C (caused by increased muscle tone)	increased muscle tone, which is more severe in lower limbs; spontaneous clonus; intense myoclonus; severe hyperreflexia	hallucinations; delirium; coma	as above

== Causes ==
Numerous medications and street drugs can cause serotonin syndrome when taken alone at high doses or in combination with other serotonergic agents. The table below lists some of these.

Class	Drugs that can induce serotonin syndrome
Antidepressants	Monoamine oxidase inhibitors (MAOIs), tricyclic antidepressants (TCAs), SSRIs, SNRIs, nefazodone, trazodone
Opioids	Dextropropoxyphene, tramadol, tapentadol, pethidine (meperidine), fentanyl, pentazocine, buprenorphine oxycodone, hydrocodone
Stimulants and entactogens	MDMA, MDA, AMT, caffeine, methamphetamine, lisdexamfetamine, amphetamine, phentermine, amfepramone (diethylpropion), sibutramine, methylphenidate, cocaine
5-HT_{1} agonists	Triptans
Psychedelics	NBOMes (e.g., 25I-NBOMe)
Herbs	St John's wort, Syrian rue, Panax ginseng, nutmeg, yohimbe
Others	Tryptophan, L-DOPA, valproate, buspirone, lithium, linezolid, dextromethorphan, 5-hydroxytryptophan, chlorpheniramine, risperidone, olanzapine, ondansetron, granisetron, metoclopramide, ritonavir, metaxalone, methylene blue

Many cases of serotonin toxicity occur in people who have ingested drug combinations that synergistically increase synaptic serotonin. It may also occur due to an overdose of a single serotonergic agent. The combination of monoamine oxidase inhibitors (MAOIs) with precursors such as L-tryptophan or 5-hydroxytryptophan pose a particularly acute risk of life-threatening serotonin syndrome. The case of combination of MAOIs with tryptamine agonists (commonly known as ayahuasca) can present similar dangers as their combination with precursors, but this phenomenon has been described in general terms as the cheese effect. Many MAOIs irreversibly inhibit monoamine oxidase. It can take at least four weeks for this enzyme to be replaced by the body in the instance of irreversible inhibitors. With respect to tricyclic antidepressants (TCAs), only clomipramine and imipramine have a risk of causing serotonin syndrome.

Many medications may have been incorrectly thought to cause serotonin syndrome. For example, some case reports have implicated atypical antipsychotics in serotonin syndrome, but it appears based on their pharmacology that they are unlikely to cause the syndrome. It has also been suggested that mirtazapine has no significant serotonergic effects and is therefore not a dual action drug. Bupropion has also been suggested to cause serotonin syndrome, although as there is no evidence that it has any significant serotonergic activity, it is thought unlikely to produce the syndrome. In 2006 the US Food and Drug Administration (FDA) issued an alert suggesting that the combined use of either SSRIs or SNRIs with triptan medications or sibutramine could potentially lead to severe cases of serotonin syndrome. This has been disputed by other researchers, as none of the cases reported by the FDA met the Hunter criteria for serotonin syndrome. The condition has however occurred in surprising clinical situations, and because of phenotypic variations among individuals, it has been associated with unexpected drugs, including mirtazapine.

Despite acting as non-selective serotonin receptor agonists, major serotonergic psychedelics like lysergic acid diethylamide (LSD) and psilocybin do not cause serotonin syndrome even in the context of extreme overdose. This is thought to be due to the fact that they act as partial agonists of serotonin receptors like the serotonin 5-HT_{2A} receptor, in contrast to serotonin itself which is a full agonist. Combination of psychedelics like LSD and psilocybin with antidepressants such as SSRIs is also not thought to pose a risk of serotonin syndrome. A 2018 retrospective analysis of 3,554 LSD-only exposures reported to poison control centers in the United States between 2000 and 2016 found that serious toxicity was infrequent. On the other hand, NBOMe psychedelics like 25I-NBOMe are more efficacious at the serotonin 5-HT_{2A} receptor and have been uniquely associated with serotonin syndrome-like toxicity. In addition, serotonergic psychedelics additionally acting as serotonin releasing agents like methylenedioxyamphetamine (MDA) and α-methyltryptamine (AMT) or additionally acting as MAOIs like ayahuasca or AMT can cause serotonin syndrome.

The relative risk and severity of serotonergic side effects and serotonin toxicity, with individual drugs and combinations, is complex. Serotonin syndrome has been reported in patients of all ages, including the elderly, children, and even newborn infants due to in utero exposure. The serotonergic toxicity of SSRIs increases with dose, but even in overdose, it is insufficient to cause fatalities from serotonin syndrome in healthy adults. Elevations of central nervous system (CNS) serotonin will typically only reach potentially fatal levels when drugs with different mechanisms of action are mixed together. Various drugs, other than SSRIs, also have clinically significant potency as serotonin reuptake inhibitors, (such as tramadol, amphetamine, and MDMA) and are associated with severe cases of the syndrome. Severe and life-threatening serotonin syndrome has been said to almost exclusively be due to a combination of antidepressants, for instance an MAOI with an SSRI. However, combination of an MAOI and a serotonin releasing agent (SRA) like MDMA can also consistently result in severe and life-threatening serotonin syndrome.

Although the most significant health risk associated with opioid overdoses is respiratory depression, it is still possible for an individual to develop serotonin syndrome from certain opioids without the loss of consciousness. However, most cases of opioid-related serotonin syndrome involve the concurrent use of a serotergenic drug such as antidepressants. Nonetheless, it is not uncommon for individuals taking opioids to also be taking antidepressants due to the comorbidity of pain and depression. Cases where opioids alone are the cause of serotonin syndrome are typically seen with tramadol, because of its dual mechanism as a serotonin–norepinephrine reuptake inhibitor. Serotonin syndrome caused by tramadol can be particularly problematic if an individual taking the drug is unaware of the risks associated with it and attempts to self-medicate symptoms such as headache, agitation, and tremors with more opioids, further exacerbating the condition.

== Pathophysiology ==
Serotonin is a neurotransmitter involved in multiple complex biological processes including aggression, pain, sleep, appetite, anxiety, depression, migraine, and vomiting. In humans the effects of excess serotonin were first noted in 1960 in patients receiving an MAOI and tryptophan. The syndrome is caused by increased serotonin in the CNS. It was originally suspected that agonism of serotonin 5-HT_{1A} receptors in central grey nuclei and the medulla oblongata was responsible for the development of the syndrome. Further study has determined that overstimulation of primarily the serotonin 5-HT_{2A} receptors appears to contribute substantially to the condition, while the serotonin 5-HT_{1A} receptor seems to play little role. However, the serotonin 5-HT_{1A} receptor may still contribute through a pharmacodynamic interaction in which increased synaptic concentrations of a serotonin agonist saturate all receptor subtypes. Additionally, noradrenergic CNS hyperactivity may play a role as CNS norepinephrine concentrations are increased in serotonin syndrome and levels appear to correlate with the clinical outcome. Other neurotransmitters may also play a role; NMDA receptor antagonists and γ-aminobutyric acid have been suggested as affecting the development of the syndrome. Serotonin toxicity is more pronounced following supra-therapeutic doses and overdoses, and they merge in a continuum with the toxic effects of overdose.

=== Spectrum concept ===
A postulated "spectrum concept" of serotonin toxicity emphasises the role that progressively increasing serotonin levels play in mediating the clinical picture as side effects merge into toxicity. The dose-response relationship is the effect of progressive elevation of serotonin, either by raising the dose of one drug, or combining it with another serotonergic drug which may produce large elevations in serotonin levels. Some experts prefer the terms serotonin toxicity or serotonin toxidrome, to more accurately reflect that it is a form of poisoning.

== Diagnosis ==
There is no specific test for serotonin syndrome. Diagnosis is by symptom observation and investigation of the person's history. Several criteria have been proposed. The first evaluated criteria were introduced in 1991 by Harvey Sternbach. Researchers later developed the Hunter Toxicity Criteria Decision Rules, which have better sensitivity and specificity, 84% and 97%, respectively, when compared with the gold standard of diagnosis by a medical toxicologist. As of 2007, Sternbach's criteria were still the most commonly used.

The most important symptoms for diagnosing serotonin syndrome are tremor, extreme aggressiveness, akathisia, or clonus (spontaneous, inducible and ocular). Physical examination of the patient should include assessment of deep tendon reflexes and muscle rigidity, the dryness of the mucosa of the mouth, the size and reactivity of the pupils, the intensity of bowel sounds, skin color, and the presence or absence of sweating. The patient's history also plays an important role in diagnosis, investigations should include inquiries about the use of prescription and over-the-counter drugs, illicit substances, and dietary supplements, as all these agents have been implicated in the development of serotonin syndrome. To fulfill the Hunter Criteria, a patient must have taken a serotonergic agent and meet one of the following conditions:

- Spontaneous clonus, or
- Inducible clonus plus agitation or diaphoresis, or
- Ocular clonus plus agitation or diaphoresis, or
- Tremor plus hyperreflexia, or
- Hypertonism plus temperature > 38 °C (100 °F) plus ocular clonus or inducible clonus

=== Differential diagnosis ===
Serotonin toxicity has a characteristic picture which is generally hard to confuse with other medical conditions, but in some situations it may go unrecognized because it may be mistaken for a viral illness, anxiety disorders, neurological disorder, anticholinergic poisoning, sympathomimetic toxicity, or worsening psychiatric condition. The condition most often confused with serotonin syndrome is neuroleptic malignant syndrome (NMS). The clinical features of neuroleptic malignant syndrome and serotonin syndrome share some features which can make differentiating them difficult. In both conditions, autonomic dysfunction and altered mental status develop. However, they are actually very different conditions with different underlying dysfunction (serotonin excess vs dopamine blockade). Both the time course and the clinical features of NMS differ significantly from those of serotonin toxicity. Serotonin toxicity has a rapid onset after the administration of a serotonergic drug and responds to serotonin blockade such as drugs like chlorpromazine and cyproheptadine. Dopamine receptor blockade (NMS) has a slow onset, typically evolves over several days after administration of a neuroleptic drug, and responds to dopamine agonists such as bromocriptine.

Differential diagnosis may become difficult in patients recently exposed to both serotonergic and neuroleptic drugs. Bradykinesia and extrapyramidal "lead pipe" rigidity are classically present in NMS, whereas serotonin syndrome causes hyperkinesia and clonus; these distinct symptoms can aid in differentiation.

== Management ==
Management is based primarily on stopping the usage of the precipitating drugs, the administration of serotonin antagonists such as cyproheptadine (with a regimen of 12 mg for the initial dose followed by 2 mg every 2 hours until clinical, while some claim that a higher initial dose up to 32 mg has more benefit), and supportive care including the control of agitation, the control of autonomic instability, and the control of hyperthermia. Additionally, those who ingest large doses of serotonergic agents may benefit from gastrointestinal decontamination with activated charcoal if it can be administered within an hour of overdose. The intensity of therapy depends on the severity of symptoms. If the symptoms are mild, treatment may only consist of discontinuation of the offending medication or medications, offering supportive measures, giving benzodiazepines for myoclonus, and waiting for the symptoms to resolve. Moderate cases should have all thermal and cardiorespiratory abnormalities corrected and can benefit from serotonin antagonists. The serotonin antagonist cyproheptadine is the recommended initial therapy, although there have been no controlled trials demonstrating its efficacy for serotonin syndrome. Despite the absence of controlled trials, there are a number of case reports detailing apparent improvement after people have been administered cyproheptadine. Animal experiments also suggest a benefit from serotonin antagonists. Cyproheptadine is only available as tablets and therefore can only be administered orally or via a nasogastric tube; it is unlikely to be effective in people administered activated charcoal and has limited use in severe cases. Cyproheptadine can be stopped when the person is no longer experiencing symptoms and the half life of serotonergic medications already passed.

Additional pharmacological treatment for severe case includes administering atypical antipsychotic drugs with serotonin antagonist activity such as olanzapine or asenapine. Critically ill people should receive the above therapies as well as sedation or neuromuscular paralysis. People who have autonomic instability such as low blood pressure require treatment with direct-acting sympathomimetics such as epinephrine, norepinephrine, or phenylephrine. Conversely, hypertension or tachycardia can be treated with short-acting antihypertensive drugs such as nitroprusside or esmolol; longer acting drugs such as propranolol should be avoided as they may lead to hypotension and shock. The cause of serotonin toxicity or accumulation is an important factor in determining the course of treatment. Serotonin is catabolized by monoamine oxidase A in the presence of oxygen, so if care is taken to prevent an unsafe spike in body temperature or metabolic acidosis, oxygenation will assist in dispatching the excess serotonin. The same principle applies to alcohol intoxication. In cases of serotonin syndrome caused by MAOIs, oxygenation will not help to dispatch serotonin. In such instances, hydration is the main concern until the enzyme is regenerated.

=== Agitation ===
Specific treatment for some symptoms may be required. One of the most important treatments is the control of agitation due to the extreme possibility of injury to the person themselves or caregivers, benzodiazepines should be administered at first sign of this. Physical restraints are not recommended for agitation or delirium as they may contribute to mortality by enforcing isometric muscle contractions that are associated with severe lactic acidosis and hyperthermia. If physical restraints are necessary for severe agitation they must be rapidly replaced with pharmacological sedation. The agitation can cause a large amount of muscle breakdown. This breakdown can cause severe damage to the kidneys through a condition called rhabdomyolysis.

=== Hyperthermia ===
Treatment for hyperthermia includes reducing muscle overactivity via sedation with a benzodiazepine. More severe cases may require muscular paralysis with vecuronium, intubation, and artificial ventilation. Suxamethonium is not recommended for muscular paralysis as it may increase the risk of cardiac dysrhythmia from hyperkalemia associated with rhabdomyolysis. Antipyretic agents are not recommended as the increase in body temperature is due to muscular activity, not a hypothalamic temperature set point abnormality.

== Prognosis ==
Upon the discontinuation of serotonergic drugs, most cases of serotonin syndrome resolve within 24 hours, although in some cases delirium may persist for a number of days. Symptoms typically persist for a longer time frame in patients taking drugs which have a long elimination half-life, active metabolites, or a protracted duration of action.

Cases have reported persisting chronic symptoms, and antidepressant discontinuation may contribute to ongoing features. Following appropriate medical management, serotonin syndrome is generally associated with a favorable prognosis.

== Epidemiology ==
Epidemiological studies of serotonin syndrome are difficult as many physicians are unaware of the diagnosis or they may miss the syndrome due to its variable manifestations. In 1998 a survey conducted in England found that 85% of the general practitioners that had prescribed the antidepressant nefazodone were unaware of serotonin syndrome. The incidence may be increasing as a larger number of pro-serotonergic drugs (drugs which increase serotonin levels) are now being used in clinical practice. One postmarketing surveillance study identified an incidence of 0.4 cases per 1000 patient-months for patients who were taking nefazodone. Additionally, around 14 to 16% of persons who overdose on SSRIs are thought to develop serotonin syndrome.

== History ==
Serotonin syndrome, or serotonin toxicity, was first reported in humans in 1982. It had previously been observed in animals. However, serotonin syndrome-like toxicity had previously been reported as early as the 1960s, but these cases were not recognized as serotonin toxicity. Serotonin syndrome was first defined as a distinct clinical entity and formally given the name "serotonin syndrome" in 1991.

== Notable cases ==
Phenelzine is an MAOI which contributed to serotonin syndrome in the Libby Zion case.

The most widely recognized example of serotonin syndrome was the death of Libby Zion in 1984. Zion was a freshman at Bennington College at her death on March 5, 1984, at age 18. She died within 8 hours of her emergency admission to the New York Hospital Cornell Medical Center. She had an ongoing history of depression, and came to the Manhattan hospital on the evening of March 4, 1984, with a fever, agitation and "strange jerking motions" of her body. She also seemed disoriented at times. The emergency room physicians were unable to diagnose her condition definitively but admitted her for hydration and observation. Her death was caused by a combination of pethidine and phenelzine. A medical intern prescribed the pethidine. The case influenced graduate medical education and residency work hours. Limits were set on working hours for medical postgraduates, commonly referred to as interns or residents, in hospital training programs, and they also now require closer senior physician supervision.

== See also ==
- Carcinoid syndrome
