= José Guadalupe Cruz =

José Guadalupe Cruz may refer to:

- José Guadalupe Cruz (writer) (1917–1989), Mexican writer
- José Guadalupe Cruz (footballer) (born 1967), football manager and former player

== See also ==
- José Cruz (disambiguation)
