= José Santa Cruz =

José Santa Cruz may refer to:

- José Santa Cruz (boxer) (born 1980), Mexican boxer.
- José Santa Cruz (actor) (1929–2024), Brazilian actor and comedian
- José Santa Cruz (athlete) (born 1954), Cuban athlete in the discus throw

== See also ==
- Jose Cruz (disambiguation)
