= Mary Noe =

American educator, author and lecturer

Mary Noe (Mary Noé) is an American educator, author and lecturer. She holds the rank of Professor, Collins College of Professional Studies St. John's University. She served as Associate Academic Dean, Collins College of Professional Studies for academic year 2015-16. Noe is the recipient of an Outstanding Faculty Achievement Award (University 2016).

In 2025, Kent State University Press published her true crime historical work The Man Who Shot J.P. Morgan: A Life of Arsenic, Anarchy, and Intrigue . It recounts the story of an early 20th century Harvard instructor who poisons his wife covering up the murder with her childbirth and Christian Science beliefs. He disappears and reinvents himself with a new identity and new wife and returns to academic life at other institutions. In his new iteration, he is an advocate for American Neutrality in the First World War. He bombs the U.S. Senate Reception Room and shoots financier J.P. Morgan Jr., who that morning was having breakfast with the British Ambassador, Sir Cecil Spring Rice at Morgan's mansion on the Gold Coast of Long Island.

== Biography ==
Noe is a graduate of Brooklyn College magna cum laude and received her Juris Doctor degree from St. John's University School of Law. She has been admitted to practice law in New York since 1989.

Judicial Notice, the journal of the Historical Society of New York Courts, published her article Murder at Madison Square Garden: A Dream Team's Insane Game of Judicial Cat and Mouse, concerning the legal proceedings surrounding the prosecution of Harry Kendall Thaw for the murder of Sanford White.

Noe has written on the subject of legal liability arising out of both data breaches and social media postings. She authored Sticks and Stones Will Break My Bones but Whether Words Harm will Be Decided by a Judge published in the January 2016 issue of the New York State Bar Association Journal (Vol. 88, No. 1). Her article "Facebook: The New Employment Battleground" was the cover-story in the June 2014 issue of the New York State Bar Association Journal (Vol. 86, No.5). She also authored the cover-story "Data Breaches" in the Summer 2012 issue of the NY Litigator, a journal of the Commercial & Federal Litigation Section of the New York State Bar Association (Vol.17, No. 1).

Noe has created and edited an undergraduate journal at St. John's,The Legal Apprentice as a showcase for quality student writing. Articles are principally on topics that intersect with the law. The inaugural issue featured welcoming remarks from Chief Judge Loretta A. Preska, U.S. District Court, Southern District of New York.

Noe served for twelve years as an Impartial Hearing Officer in cases brought by parents seeking tuition reimbursement or other funding for students with disabilities under a federal law known as Individuals with Disabilities Education Act or IDEA. Noe, together with co-authors Mary McCaffrey, M.S, and Robert Meager, PsyD published IEP Workshop Building Teacher-Parent Partnerships (Attainment Co. 2011) which is believed to be the first work in this area accompanied by a DVD displaying a simulated meeting between parents and school officials. She frequently writes and lectures on the subject of special education law. IDEA requires public schools in the U.S. to develop an IEP or Individualized Education Program for each student with a statutorily defined disability.

Noe also has served as an administrative law judge for the New York State Office of Professional Medical Conduct, the body with jurisdiction over disciplinary cases against medical doctors in New York.
