= Marco Antonio Gutiérrez Romero =

Mexican politician (born 1955)

- Born: 30 August 1955 (age 70); Santiago Tulantepec, Hidalgo, Mexico
- Occupation: Politician
- Political party: PRI

Marco Antonio Gutiérrez Romero (born 30 August 1955) is a Mexican politician affiliated with the Institutional Revolutionary Party (PRI). In the 2003 mid-terms he was elected to the Chamber of Deputies to represent the State of Mexico's 10th district.
