= Daily Assessment of Symptoms – Anxiety =

Questionnaire to assess anxiety levels

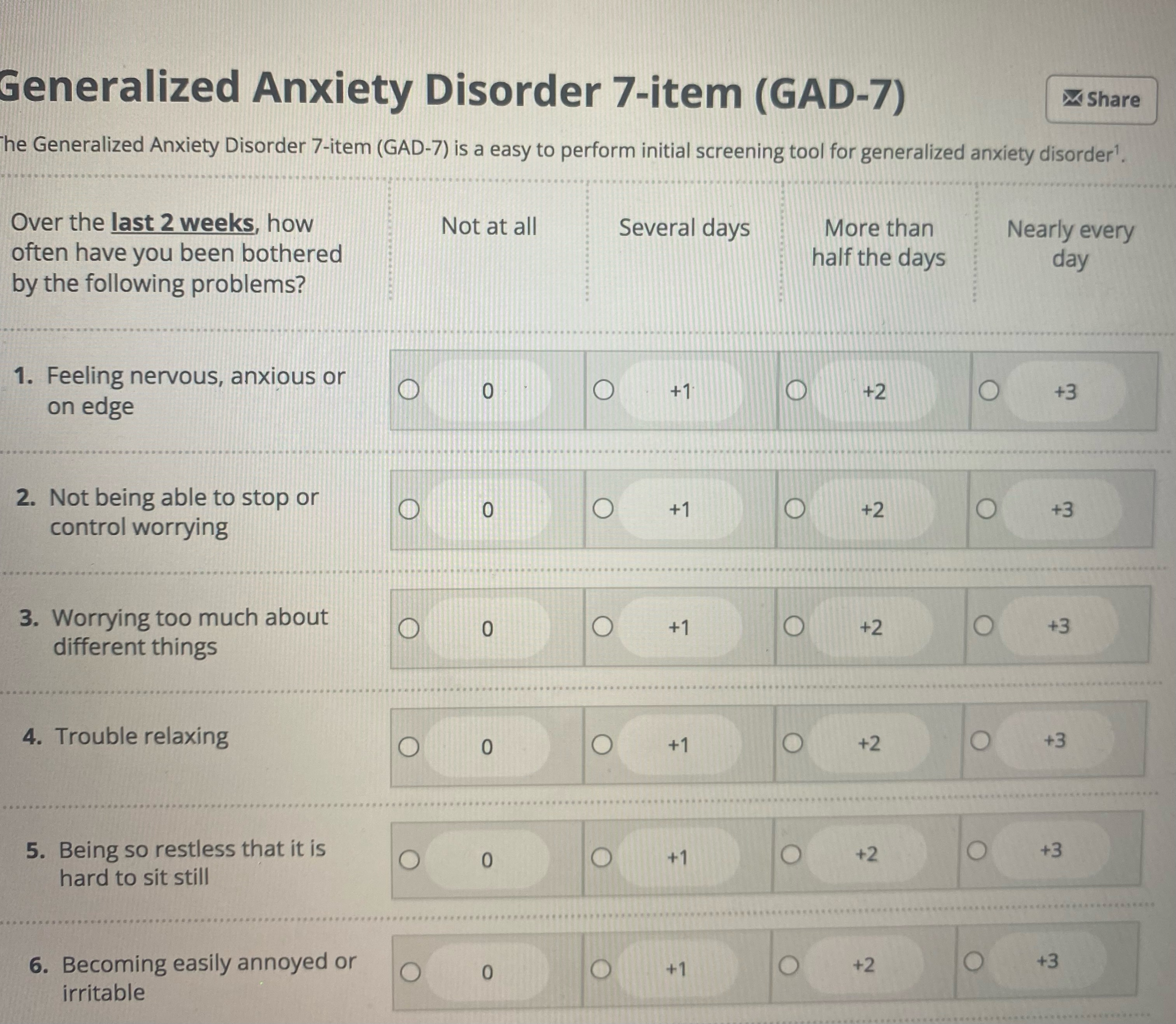
GAD daily assessment example

The Daily Assessment of Symptoms – Anxiety (DAS-A) questionnaire was specifically developed to detect reduction of anxiety symptoms in patients with generalized anxiety disorder (GAD) during the first week of treatment. It is also meant to help those suffering from certain symptoms identify and recognize that they are experiencing anxiety. This assessment can often reduce anxiety in patients due to the diagnosis and results at the end.

== Overview ==
The original version of the instrument was designed for use in clinical trials assessing new pharmaceutical treatments for patients with GAD. The instrument is able to detect symptom changes within 24 hours of treatment. Currently,^{[2009]} this is the only GAD specific tool validated to assess symptom improvement sooner than one week following treatment initiation. "We all deal with anxiety. At times it can be a good thing; it helps us meet deadlines and to know when we're in danger. Other times, it can be a nuisance. If you experience anxiety on a regular basis that interrupts your daily activities, you may suffer from an anxiety disorder."

== Symptoms ==
"The key to this disorder is an excessive amount of anxiety. Someone with GAD would worry excessively about finances, losing their job, the car breaking down, whether they are being a good parent, and coping with difficulties that arise." This assessment can take those GAD symptoms to help determine whether you are continuing to experience anxiety before or after treatment. Some of the symptoms that this daily assessment detects are as follows: Insomnia, Lack of Appetite, Over eating, Upset stomach, Headache, Decreased Sexual Desire, Lack of Focus, Low Energy, Nervousness, Irritability, and being Restless. It can also detect certain effects of anxiety such as Confusion, Emotional Imbalance, Erratic decisions, Forgetfulness, Anger, Depression and Panic Attacks. As patients complete their daily assessment of symptoms, these are some of the symptoms, signs and effects of anxiety.

== Accessibility ==
This questionnaire is accessible to any person who is interested in filling it out. Behavioral health screenings are the quickest way to determine if one should seek a health professional. This document can be accessed through a primary care doctor, a psychiatrist or psychologist, therapist, or online.

== Interpretation ==
"When screening for anxiety, a score of 8 or greater represents a reasonable point for identifying probable cases of generalized anxiety disorder; further diagnostic assessment is warranted to determine the presence and type of anxiety disorder. Using a cut-off of 8 the GAD-7 has a sensitivity of 92% and specificity of 76% for diagnosis generalized anxiety disorder. The following cut-offs correlate with level of anxiety severity:

- Score 0-4: Minimal Anxiety
- Score 5-9: Mild Anxiety
- Score 10-14: Moderate Anxiety
- Score greater than 15: Severe Anxiety

Based on a recent meta-analysis, some experts have recommended considering using a cut-off of 8 in order to optimize sensitivity without compromising specificity."

"Completing a screening will help you determine if your recent thoughts or behaviors may be associated with a common, treatable mental health or substance use issue. Each screening only takes a few minutes to complete. At the end you will see your results and any recommended resources."
