= Bertrand M. Bell =

American physician

Bertrand Monroe Bell
- Born: December 19, 1929
- Died: October 4, 2016 (aged 86); Manhattan, New York, U.S.
- Education: State University of New York at Buffalo (MD, 1955)
- Occupations: Physician, professor
- Known for: Chair of the "Bell Commission"; advocacy for regulation of resident work hours
- Medical career
- Profession: Physician, academic
- Field: Internal medicine, medical education
- Institutions: Albert Einstein College of Medicine; Bronx Municipal Hospital Center

Bertrand Monroe Bell (December 19, 1929 – October 4, 2016) was an American physician and Professor of Medicine at the Albert Einstein College of Medicine, best known for his lifelong efforts to regulate resident work hours. He chaired the New York State Ad Hoc Advisory Committee on Emergency Services, a committee appointed in response to the death of Libby Zion, that became known to the general public as the "Bell Commission."

Bell was a 1955 graduate of the State University of New York at Buffalo's School Of Medicine. He served as Director of Ambulatory Services at the Bronx Municipal Hospital Center until 1992, when he was dismissed by Dean Dominick Purpura. He coined the mantra, "see one, do one, teach one, kill one," a play on the dictum "see one, do one, teach one," that had shaped medical education in the United States during the 1970s.

Bell had also served for many years on the board of directors of the Griffon Corporation.

Bell died at his Manhattan home on October 4, 2016, of kidney failure at the age of 86.

== See also ==
- Libby Zion Law
- Medical resident work hours
