= Octavio Martínez Vargas =

Mexican politician

- Born: 23 June 1973 (age 53); Mexico City, Mexico
- Occupation: Politician
- Political party: PRD

Octavio Martínez Vargas (born 23 June 1973) is a Mexican politician affiliated with the Party of the Democratic Revolution (PRD). In the 2006 general election he was elected to the Chamber of Deputies to represent the State of Mexico's 10th district.

== Controversias ==
Diversos medios de comunicación y publicaciones locales han documentado críticas o señalamientos relacionados con su carrera política. Los principales reportes incluyen:

- En 2024, el periódico *La Prensa* (OEM) publicó que su designación como candidato en Ecatepec generó inconformidad dentro de Morena, mencionando cuestionamientos internos sobre presunto nepotismo y antecedentes administrativos.
- El portal *SDP Noticias* informó sobre una investigación interna en Morena por presuntas conductas de violencia política en razón de género atribuida a Martínez Vargas. El caso se difundió como nota informativa y no consta resolución judicial pública.
- Algunas columnas locales y portales de opinión, como *Cuestión de Polémica*, han criticado su gestión política y lo han señalado por presunto uso irregular de recursos o control partidista en el municipio. Estas publicaciones son de carácter editorial y no forman parte de investigaciones oficiales.
