= James D. Weinrich =

James Donald "Jim" Weinrich (born 1950) is an American sex researcher and psychobiologist. Much of his work examines the relationship of biology and sexual orientation. He won the Outstanding Contributions to Sexual Science Award at the 2011 Society for the Scientific Study of Sexuality (SSSS) Western Region annual meeting. He has also won the SSSS Hugo Beigel Award for the best paper published in The Journal of Sex Research (co-authored with Richard Pillard). Weinrich served as the editor-in-chief of the Journal of Bisexuality from 2011 to 2014. He has also served on the editorial boards for The Journal of Sex Research and the Journal of Homosexuality.

== Life and career ==
Weinrich earned a bachelor's degree in mathematics from Princeton University in 1972. He graduated with a Ph.D. in biology from Harvard University in 1976. He was Robert Trivers' first graduate student, and his 1976 dissertation addressed social-class differences in heterosexual behaviors, and the evolutionary adaptiveness of same-sex attraction.

For the next three years, he was a Harvard Junior Fellow. He then moved to Baltimore for a post-doctoral fellowship at Johns Hopkins University with sexologist John Money. In 1983, he went to Boston to work with Richard Pillard at Boston University School of Medicine. While working with Pillard, he devised "The Periodic Table of the Gender Transposition." In 1987, he moved to the University of California, San Diego to work with Igor Grant researching effects of AIDS on the brain. He served as Assistant Adjunct Professor of Psychiatry and in 1990 was appointed the original Center Manager and Data Manager for the HIV Neurobehavioral Research Center (HNRC). He later became Principal Investigator of the HNRC Sexology Project, serving until 2000. After working for several years as an independent Internet consultant and entrepreneur, Weinrich returned to teaching in 2006, and he returned to school to earn a master's degree in psychology from San Diego State University. Since moving to San Diego, he has taught at San Diego State University, Grossmont College, Miramar College, Southwestern College, San Diego City College, National University and California State University San Marcos.

Among Weinrich's contributions are the "Limerent and Lusty Sex Theory" developed with Richard Pillard, which holds that there are two kinds of sex drives, and that both exist in men and women. He and Pillard also found that homosexuality runs in some families.

== Selected bibliography ==
- Pillard, RC; Weinrich, JD (1987). "The periodic table model of the gender transpositions: Part I. A theory based on masculinization and defeminization of the brain". Journal of Sex Research. 23 (4): 425–454. doi:10.1080/00224498709551384.
- Weinrich, JD (1988). "The periodic table model of the gender transpositions: Part II. Limerent and lusty sexual attractions and the nature of bisexuality". Journal of Sex Research. 24 (1): 113–129. doi:10.1080/00224498809551402. PMID 22375639.
- Weinrich, JD (1997). "Strange bedfellows: Homosexuality, gay liberation, and the Internet". Journal of Sex Education & Therapy. 22 (1): 58–66. doi:10.1080/01614576.1997.11074173.
- Kaplan, RM; Anderson, JP; Patterson, TL; et al. (1995). "Validity of the Quality of Well-Being Scale for persons with human immunodeficiency virus infection. HNRC Group. HIV Neurobehavioral Research Center". Psychosom Med. 57 (2): 138–47. doi:10.1097/00006842-199503000-00006. PMID 7792372.
- Weinrich, JD; Atkinson, JH (Feb 1995). "Jr, McCutchan JA, Grant I: HIV Neurobehavioral Research Center (1995). Is gender dysphoria dysphoric? Elevated depression and anxiety in gender dysphoric and nondysphoric homosexual and bisexual men in an HIV sample". Arch Sex Behav. 24 (1): 55–72. doi:10.1007/BF01541989. PMID 7733805.
- Gonsiorek, JC; Sell, RL; Weinrich, JD (1995). "Definition and measurement of sexual orientation". Suicide Life Threat Behav. 25 Suppl: 40–51. doi:10.1111/j.1943-278X.1995.tb00489.x. PMID 8553428.
- Weinrich, JD (1995). "Biological research on sexual orientation: a critique of the critics". J Homosex. 28 (1–2): 197–213. doi:10.1300/J082v28n01_11. PMID 7560921.
- Snyder, PJ; Weinrich, JD; Pillard, RC (Aug 1994). "Personality and lipid level differences associated with homosexual and bisexual identity in men". Arch Sex Behav. 23 (4): 433–51. doi:10.1007/BF01541408. PMID 7993184.
- Pillard, RC; Rosen, LR; Meyer-Bahlburg, H; et al. (1993). "Psychopathology and social functioning in men prenatally exposed to diethylstilbestrol (DES)". Psychosom Med. 55 (6): 485–91. doi:10.1097/00006842-199311000-00003. PMID 8310108.
- Weinrich, JD; Snyder, PJ; Pillard, RC; Grant, I; Jacobson, DL; Robinson, SR; McCutchan, JA (Apr 1993). "A factor analysis of the Klein sexual orientation grid in two disparate samples". Arch Sex Behav. 22 (2): 157–68. doi:10.1007/BF01542364. PMID 8476335.
- Grant, I; Olshen, RA; Atkinson, JH; Heaton, RK; Nelson, J; McCutchan, JA; Weinrich, JD (1993). "Depressed mood does not explain neuropsychological deficits in HIV-infected persons". Neuropsychology. 7 (1): 53–61. doi:10.1037/0894-4105.7.1.53.
- Weinrich, JD; Grant, I; Jacobson, DL; Robinson, SR; McCutchan, JA (Dec 1992). "HIV Neurobehavioral Research Center (1992). Effects of recalled childhood gender nonconformity on adult genitoerotic role and AIDS exposure". Arch Sex Behav. 21 (6): 559–85. doi:10.1007/BF01542256. PMID 1482281.
- Day, JJ; Grant, I; Atkinson, JH; Brysk, LT; McCutchan, JA; Hesselink, JR; Heaton, RK; Weinrich, JD; Spector, SA; Richman, DD (Winter 1992). "Incidence of AIDS dementia in a two-year follow-up of AIDS and ARC patients on an initial phase II AZT placebo-controlled study: San Diego cohort". J Neuropsychiatry Clin Neurosci. 4 (1): 15–20. doi:10.1176/jnp.4.1.15. PMID 1627957.
- Gonsiorek JC, Weinrich JD (1991). Homosexuality: research implications for public policy. Sage Publications, ISBN 978-0-8039-3764-2
- Weinrich, JD (Oct 1988). "Sex survey". Science. 242 (4875): 16. doi:10.1126/science.3175628. PMID 3175628.
- Weinrich JD (1987). Sexual landscapes: why we are what we are, why we love whom we love. Scribner's, ISBN 978-0-684-18705-1
- Pillard, RC; Weinrich, JD (Aug 1986). "Evidence of familial nature of male homosexuality". Arch Gen Psychiatry. 43 (8): 808–12. doi:10.1001/archpsyc.1986.01800080094012. PMID 3729676.
- Money, J; Weinrich, JD (1983). "Juvenile, pedophile, heterophile: hermeneutics of science, medicine and law in two outcome studies". Med Law. 2 (1): 39–54. PMID 6686993.
- Weinrich JD (1980). Toward a sociobiological theory of the emotions. In Plutchik R, Kellerman H (eds.) Emotion: Theory, research, and experience. Academic Press, ISBN 978-0-12-558701-3
- Weinrich, JD (Spring 1978). "Nonreproduction, homosexuality, transsexualism, and intelligence: I. A systematic literature search". J Homosex. 3 (3): 275–89. doi:10.1300/J082v03n03_10. PMID 659850.
- Weinrich, JD (1977). "Human sociobiology: Pair-bonding and resource predictability (effects of social class and race)". Behavioral Ecology and Sociobiology. 2 (2): 91–118.
- Weinrich JD (1975). Human family size and marital relations: a biological interpretation. Harvard, Bowdoin Prize for Essays in the Natural Sciences
