= Mixed anxiety–depressive disorder =

Diagnostic category in the ICD-10

Mixed anxiety–depressive disorder (MADD) is a diagnostic category that defines patients who have both anxiety and depressive symptoms of limited and equal intensity accompanied by at least some autonomic nervous system features. Autonomic features are involuntary physical symptoms usually caused by an overactive nervous system, such as panic attacks or intestinal distress. The World Health Organization's ICD-10 describes Mixed anxiety and depressive disorder: "...when symptoms of anxiety and depression are both present, but neither is clearly predominant, and neither type of symptom is present to the extent that justifies a diagnosis if considered separately. When both anxiety and depressive symptoms are present and severe enough to justify individual diagnoses, both diagnoses should be recorded and this category should not be used."

Mixed anxiety–depressive disorder should only be considered as a diagnosis when the symptoms impede a person's functioning in day-to-day life and/or decrease their quality of life and symptoms of anxiety and depression are roughly in equal measure without the severity of major depressive disorder or an anxiety disorder. Typically, this means that the symptoms of mixed anxiety–depressive disorder are not severe if the anxiety and depression are considered separately. However, when placed together, their effect is strong enough to cause distress and a decrease in functioning. This is what causes mixed anxiety–depressive disorder to be classified as its own distinct psychological disorder.

== Diagnosis ==
The symptoms of anxiety and depression disorders can be very similar. A diagnosis of mixed anxiety–depressive disorder as opposed to a diagnosis of depression or an anxiety disorder can be difficult. Due to this, it has long been a struggle to find a singular set of criteria to use in the diagnosis of mixed-anxiety depressive disorder. The Diagnostic and Statistical Manual of Mental Health Disorders IV has defined certain requirements for diagnosing mixed anxiety–depressive disorder:

- A dysphoric mood is chronic or recurring for a minimum of four weeks and has at least four of the following symptoms: troubles concentrating or with memory, disturbed sleep, tiredness or lack of energy, feeling irritable, worrying, crying easily, enhanced sensory state, expecting the worst, feeling hopeless or pessimistic, or having low self-esteem/feeling worthless.
- The symptoms presented are not caused by medications, drugs, or a health condition.
- The symptoms cause significant impairments or distresses in aspects of daily life.
- The symptoms do not meet the criteria for different and separate mental health disorders. Around 60% of individuals with major depressive disorder also experience a form of anxiety disorder, so the disorders are often comorbid. However, mixed anxiety–depressive disorder is often not as severe or with less symptoms than comorbid anxiety and depressive disorders.

The validity and clinical usefulness of mixed anxiety–depressive disorder as a diagnostic category are under debate. It has not been included in the DSM-5 since the proposed diagnostic criteria turned out to be not sufficiently reliable.

== Risk factors ==
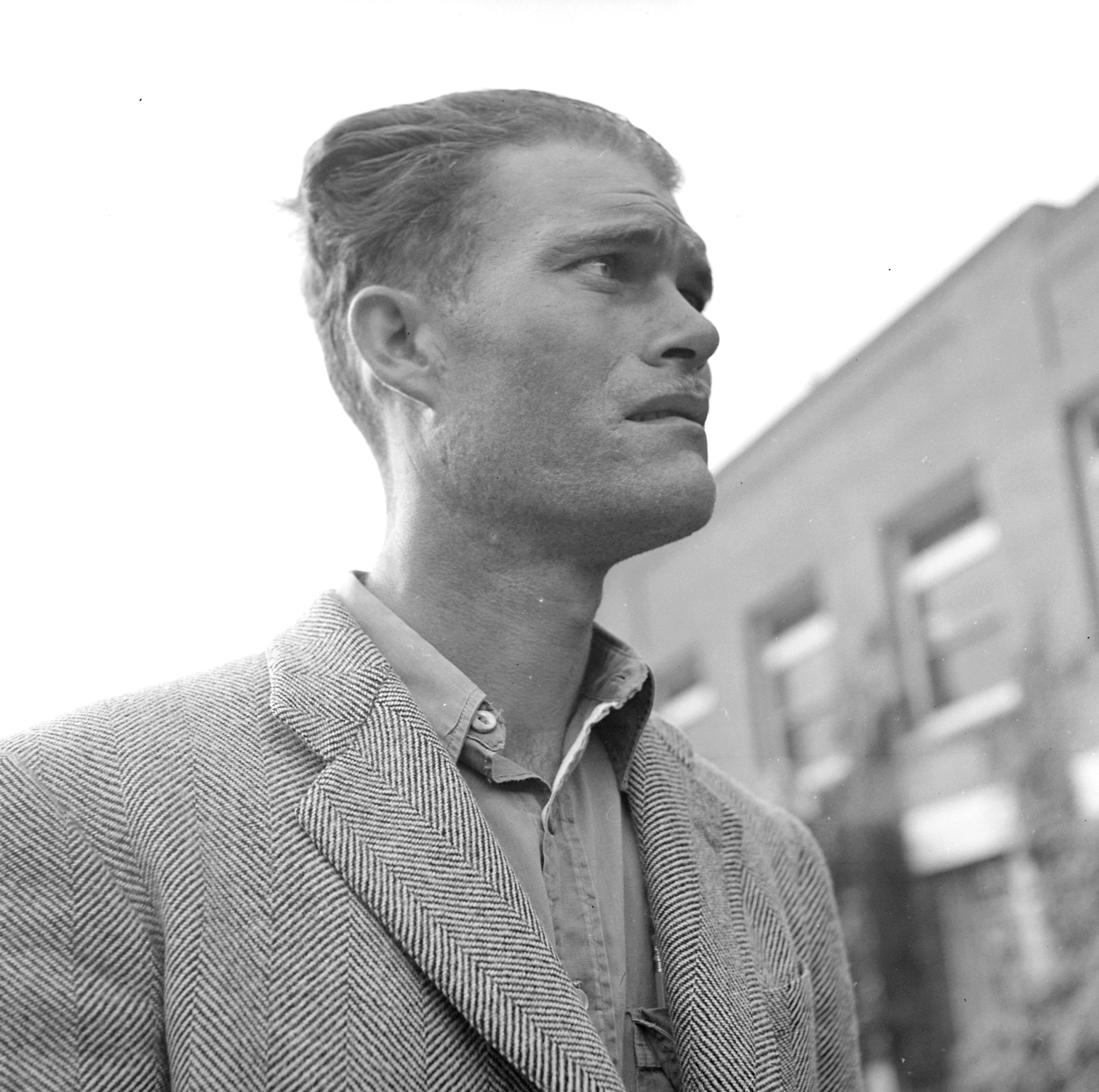
A job applicant with a facial expression indicative of anxiety and worry

Risk factors for mixed anxiety–depressive disorder often overlap with risk factors for anxiety and depression. These risk factors can include:

- Having a family history of mental health disorders, including substance abuse disorders
- Living in poverty or struggling financially
- Lacking familial or social support
- Having a serious or chronic illness
- Having low self-esteem
- Having had a form of childhood trauma
- Having to deal with an increased amount of daily stress
- Old age

The risk factors tend to point to general stress as a primary risk factor for developing mixed anxiety–depressive disorder. It is possible that measures to reduce stress could reduce the incidence of the disorder.

== Treatment ==
The priority is to treat the more disabling of either the anxiety or depression first and then consider treatments such as antidepressants and/or cognitive behavioral therapy (CBT) which are effective for both anxiety and depression. CBT often involves teaching methods to control bouts of depression and anxiety. A patient may be taught breathing methods to combat anxiety or positive self-talk to combat depression. Other, less directed forms of therapy can be used, with similar positive effects. If these tactics prove ineffective, psychiatric drugs may also be added to the treatment. SSRIs have been shown to be effective against both anxiety and depression, and are the most common drugs in response to mixed anxiety–depressive disorder. Further treatment may point to symptoms that require a diagnosis of either an anxiety disorder and a depressive disorder.

== Causes ==
Throughout studies of anxiety and depressive disorders, scientists have been unable to locate a singular cause. The possible causes of anxiety and depression are often similar to one another and the comorbidity of the two disorders is quite high, with 60% of those with depression also having some form of anxiety disorder.

There are multiple possible causes for mixed anxiety–depressive disorder, but they can be separated into three main categories: biological, psychological, and environmental factors. Biological factors are factors such as genetic predisposition and issues with neurotransmitters. Scientists have suggested a link between anxiety and an overactive nervous system, but this has not been confirmed. Psychological factors include psychological damage or struggles, such as excessive stress or trauma. Environmental factors are often linked to psychological factors, as things that cause stress or trauma are environmental factors. Causes of stress in the environment can be things like a poor home environment or poverty.

Psychological causes are often complicated and the direct cause of mixed anxiety–depressive disorder is unknown. Usually, it is assumed that psychological conditions are caused by a combination of biological, psychological, and environmental conditions. The high comorbidity of depression and anxiety, as well as the existence of mixed anxiety–depressive disorder suggests that these two conditions have similar causes, but this is still unconfirmed.

== See also ==
- Generalized anxiety disorder
