= Sidney Zion =

American journalist (1933–2009)

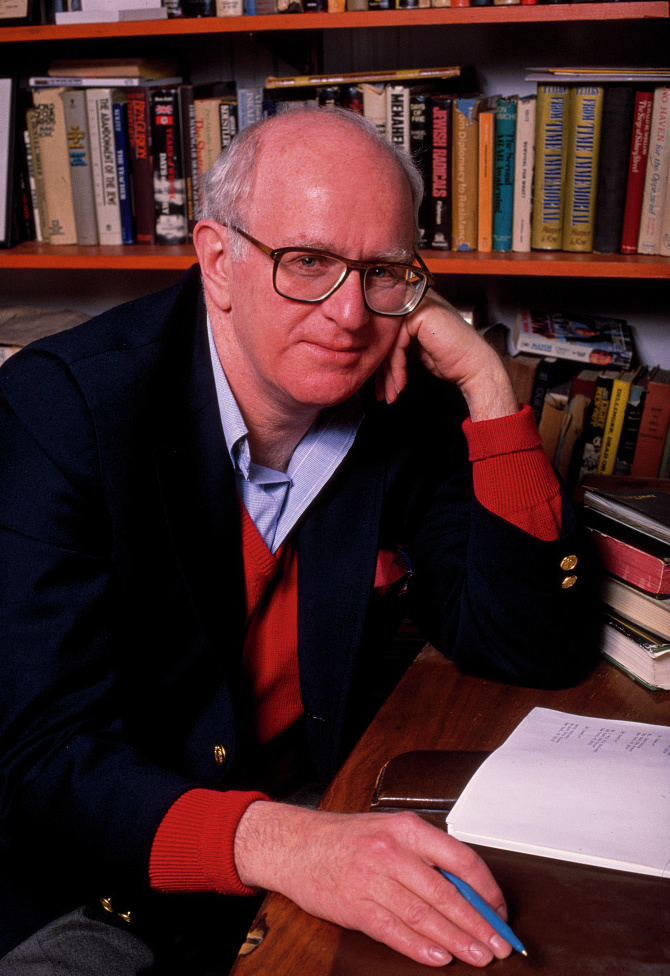
- Zion in 1988
- Born: November 14, 1933; Passaic, New Jersey, U.S.
- Died: August 2, 2009 (aged 75); New York, New York, U.S.
- Education: University of Pennsylvania; Yale Law School
- Occupation: Journalist
- Spouse: Elsa H. Zion
- Children: Libby Zion

Sidney E. Zion (November 14, 1933 – August 2, 2009) was an American writer. His works include Markers, Begin from Beginning, Read All about It, Trust Your Mother but Cut the Cards (collections of his columns), Loyalty and Betrayal: The Story of the American Mob and Markers (a novel). He co-authored The Autobiography of Roy Cohn. He also was a co-founder and co-editor of Scanlan's Monthly magazine.

== Early life and education ==
Zion graduated from the University of Pennsylvania and Yale Law School.

== Career ==
After graduating university, Zion worked as a trial lawyer until becoming Assistant US Attorney for New Jersey in 1961. He then turned to journalism and writing novels. He worked for various New York publications, including The New York Times, New York Daily News, New York Post and New York Magazine.

In 1971, Zion revealed that Daniel Ellsberg was the source of the Pentagon Papers, the classified study on the history of United States' political and military involvement in Vietnam from 1945 to 1967. It detailed the Johnson Administration's deceit in Vietnam, and at that time was being published by the Times and The Washington Post. Zion, who was not affiliated with any news organization at the time, made the revelation on a popular New York City radio show.

He owned a steakhouse during the early 1980s called Broadway Joe. It was located on West 46th Street.

== Personal life ==
Zion was married to Elsa H. Zion, until her death in 2005; their daughter, Libby Zion, died at age 18 in New York Hospital in 1984. Her death and the subsequent investigation and trial led to improvements in hospital residents' working conditions. Sidney Zion died in 2009 after a brief battle with cancer.
