= Noé Hernández =

Noé Hernández may refer to:

- Noé Hernández González (born 1965), Mexican politician
- Noé Hernández (actor) (born 1969), Mexican actor
- Noé Hernández (racewalker) (1978–2013), Mexican race walker
