= Gamisoyo-San =

Herbal medicine

Gamisoyo-San, also spelled Gamisoyosan, is a traditional multi-herbal medicine used in China and Korea.

Gamisoyo-San is composed of Bupleurum chinense (1 g), Angelicae sinensis (1 g), Paeoniae Radix (1 g), Atractylodis macrocephalae (1 g), Sclerotium Poriae (1 g), Rhizoma Zingiberis (0.33 g), Paeonia suffruticosa (0.67 g), Gardenia jasminoides (0.67 g), Mentha haplocalyx (0.33 g), and Glycyrrhiza uralensis (0.67 g).

== Uses ==
In Korea, Gamisoyo-San has been used to treat dysmenorrhea, infertility, and insomnia.

In the 1960s, studies of mice given Gamisoyo-San suggested it may "modulate bowel activity" and could be used to treat GI motility diseases. Some research in mice has suggested Gamisoyo-San may help quality of life for individuals with amyotrophic lateral sclerosis.
