= José Luis Cruz Flores Gómez =

Mexican politician

- Born: 3 May 1957; Cuauhtémoc, D.F., Mexico
- Died: 25 December 2023 (aged 66); Jalcomulco, Veracruz, Mexico
- Occupation: Politician
- Political party: PRI

José Luis Cruz Flores Gómez (Note: In this Mexican name, the surname is Flores and the second or maternal family name is Gómez.) (3 May 1957 – 25 December 2023) was a Mexican politician affiliated with the Institutional Revolutionary Party (PRI).

Flores Gómez was born in Mexico City in 1957. He studied for a law degree, but did not complete it. He served as the municipal president of Ecatepec, State of Mexico, in 2006. In the 2012 general election, he was elected to the Chamber of Deputies to represent the State of Mexico's 10th district during the 62nd session of Congress.

He died on 25 December 2023 in Jalcomulco, Veracruz, where he had moved after withdrawing from public life.
