= Agitation (medical) =

- Other names: Psychomotor agitation, restlessness
- Specialty: Psychiatry, Neurology, Emergency medicine
- Symptoms: Excessive motor activity, restlessness, pacing, hand-wringing, fidgeting, verbal outbursts
- Complications: Injury, aggression, worsening of underlying condition
- Usual onset: Variable
- Duration: Variable, often acute
- Causes: Psychiatric conditions (e.g. schizophrenia, bipolar disorder), delirium, substance use, withdrawal, medication side effects
- Risk factors: Underlying psychiatric or neurological disorders, drug or alcohol use
- Differential diagnosis: Anxiety, akathisia, delirium, psychosis
- Prevention: Management of underlying conditions, medication adherence, early recognition
- Treatment: Sedation, antipsychotics, benzodiazepines, behavioral interventions
- Prognosis: Depends on cause and treatment
- Frequency: Common in psychiatric and emergency settings

Agitation is a state of heightened motor and cognitive activity characterized by excessive or inappropriate verbal and physical behaviors, emotional excitement, and restlessness, often arising as a symptom of underlying medical, psychiatric, or neurological conditions. It is considered both a medical and psychiatric emergency due to the potential for harm to patients, caregivers, and healthcare providers, and may escalate to aggression or violence if not promptly recognized and managed.

== Causes ==
The etiology of agitation is multifactorial, encompassing acute medical illnesses (such as infections, metabolic disturbances, or pain), substance intoxication or withdrawal, delirium, and a spectrum of psychiatric disorders including mood, psychotic, and personality disorders.

== Diagnosis ==
Early identification and a systematic evaluation to determine underlying causes are critical, as agitation of unknown origin should be presumed to have a medical cause until proven otherwise, particularly in populations such as the elderly or those without a prior psychiatric history.

== Management ==
Effective management relies on a combination of non-pharmacological de-escalation strategies and, when necessary, targeted pharmacological interventions, always prioritizing the safety of all involved.
