= Noe Ramirez =

Noe Ramirez may refer to:

- Noé Ramirez (born 1989), American baseball player
- Noé Ramírez Mandujano, former Mexican anti-drug law enforcement chief
