= Noé Martín Vázquez =

Mexican politician

- Born: 19 July 1970 (age 55); Mexico City, Mexico
- Occupation: Politician
- Political party: PRI

Noé Martín Vázquez Pérez (born 19 July 1970) is a Mexican politician from the Institutional Revolutionary Party (PRI). In the 2009 mid-terms he was elected to the Chamber of Deputies to represent the State of Mexico's 10th district during the 61st session of Congress.
