= Anne Noë =

Belgian footballer and coach

Personal information
- Full name: Annie Ida Jenny Noë Haesendonck
- Date of birth: 13 April 1959 (age 67)
- Place of birth: Louvain, Belgium
- Position: Goalkeeper

Senior career*
Years	Team	Apps	(Gls)
1976–1981	FC Lady's Scherpenheuvel		
1981–1991	Standard Fémina de Liège		
1991–1994	KFC Rapide Wezemaal		

International career
1979–1994	Belgium	59	(0)

Managerial career
- 1994–1999: Belgium (Assistant)
- 1999–2010: Belgium
- ~2002~: Belgium U20
- * Club domestic league appearances and goals

Annie Ida Jenny Noë Haesendonck (born 13 April 1959) is a Belgian football coach and former international goalkeeper. She won 59 caps for the Belgium women's national football team between 1979 and 1994. When playing for the women's national team, Noë had to wear Jean-Marie Pfaff's old shirts. She stopped playing when she was 35 years old, then became a coach with the Royal Belgian Football Association. In 1999 she was appointed head coach of the national team.
