= Office of Professional Medical Conduct =

The Office of Professional Medical Conduct (OPMC) is a branch of the New York State Department of Health. The OPMC is charged with investigating complaints against physicians, unlicensed and licensed residents, and physician assistants in New York. In 1976, the Board for Professional Medical Conduct (BPMC) was created under the auspices of the State Health Department, and has continued in that capacity since that time. The mission of the OPMC is to "protect the public from medical negligence, incompetence and illegal or unethical practice by physicians.",

The OPMC's hierarchical structure is such that the program falls under the control of the Commissioner of Health, currently Howard A. Zucker. Arthur S. Hengerer is the current Chairman of the Board for Professional Medical Conduct. Keith Servis is the director of the Office of Professional Medical Conduct.

Based on the 2008-2009 Annual Report, the OPMC investigated 9,103 complaints in 2009. About 51% of these complaints were generated by the public. There were 154 serious sanctions against licenses in 2009, with 88 censure and reprimands.
