= Psychiatric Clinics of North America =

- Discipline: Psychiatry
- Language: English
- Edited by: Harsh Trivedi

Publication details
- History: 1978–present
- Publisher: Elsevier
- Frequency: Quarterly
- Impact factor: 2.281 (2018)

Standard abbreviations
- ISO 4: Psychiatr. Clin. N. Am.
- NLM: Psychiatr Clin North Am

Indexing
- CODEN: PCAMDG
- ISSN: 0193-953X
- LCCN: 84641257
- OCLC no.: 60626441

Links
- Journal homepage

Psychiatric Clinics of North America is a quarterly peer-reviewed medical journal covering psychiatry and patient management. It was established in 1978 and is published by Elsevier. The current editor of the journal is Harsh Trivedi.

== Publishing and editorship ==
The journal is indexed in Index Medicus, MEDLINE, and PubMed from 1981 onwards.

Among the first major publishing projects, in the wake of the launch of the journal, was a series of symposiums on chosen subjects in the field of psychiatry. Each volume was assigned to an editor. In 1978 the journal published a symposium on obesity under the editorship of Albert J. Stunkard. In 1979 the journal published a second volume in liaison psychiatry, under the editorship of Chase Patterson Kimball.

This trend in publishing continued in the 1980s. 1980 saw the release of volume 3 in the symposium on sexuality, under the editorship of Jon K. Meyer, and in 1981 followed a volume on borderline disorders, edited by Michael H. Stone.

In 1984 the journal published a symposium on multiple personality under the editorship of Bennett G. Braun, and the following year saw the publication of two volumes, first a symposium on Self-Destructive Behavior, edited by Alec Roy, then a volume on Child Psychiatry, edited by J.H Beitchman.
