= Huseng Sisiw =

Filipino writer (1746–1829)

José de la Cruz
- Born: December 21, 1746; Tondo, Manila, Captaincy General of the Philippines
- Died: March 12, 1829 (aged 82); Manila, Captaincy General of the Philippines
- Writing career
- Notable works: "Singsing ng Pag-ibig"; Principe Baldovino

José de la Cruz (December 21, 1746 – March 12, 1829), more popularly known as Huseng Sisiw, was a Tagalog writer during the Spanish colonization of the Philippines.

== Biography ==
De la Cruz was born in Tondo, Manila on December 21, 1746.

Coming from a poor family, he could not afford to study. However, by his efforts, he was able to learn Katon at Cartilla (Spanish primers), the Doctrina Christiana (the first catechism produced in the Philippines), Philosophy, Canon law, and Theology.

One day, when he was taking a bath in a river near their house, two Spanish Jesuits passed by and asked him for the right way. Because of De la Cruz's fondness for reading, he was able to understand their language and was able to communicate with them. The Spanish priests were amazed by his intelligence and his politeness, so they were not able to go to their destination, but instead, they talked with him more to get to know him better. De la Cruz was eight years old then.

When he was a teenager, he started to have a better grasp of the Tagalog language, think of bigger ideas, and possess writing skills that awakened the hearts and souls of the people partly (or mostly) due to his constant reading of the Bible.

Besides Spanish and Tagalog, he also learned Latin and Greek. He could also manage to write plays in just a span of time. During one town feast in the province of Batangas, he was invited to stage one of his plays. The priest heading the event told him to stage a play based on a historical event instead. He was forced to write a story and teach the actors in one night, but the play was still a success. He could also simultaneously dictate poems into five different verses, all at the same time.

He was known for his ability to write poems well, so many asked him to teach them how to rhyme words. He earned the moniker "Huseng Sisiw" (literally, "José the Chick") because when people would ask him to write love poems, he requested live chicks (sisiw in Tagalog) to be given to him as a form of payment. In addition, his dietary preferences involved eating younger livestock, those that have not yet reached adulthood, including vegetables and roasted pig.

He was also the mentor of Francisco Balagtas, a poet who would later be known as the "Father of Tagalog Literature" in poetry.

None of De la Cruz's works were ever published in his lifetime.

== Legacy ==
...my works have their own minds. I thought that I do not need a book that is expensive, but a book that has substance and meaning. — José de la Cruz to arrogant experts who were able to finish their studies

De la Cruz was one of the three poets whose names are prominent for the use of "Corrido", a type/style of poem, in the history of Literature. The other two are Francisco Balagtas, his student, and Ananias Zorilla. Some of his writings in corrido style are Clarito, Adela at Florante, Floro at Clavela, Doce Pares de Francia, Rodrigo de Villas, and the famous Historia Famoso de Bernardo Carpio.

He is also given the honor of "Hari ng Mga Makata" (King of the poets) in the Philippines.

== Literary works ==
According to the elders, de la Cruz was very careful with his writings, and he was never content with the works that were considered good by others. Therefore, only a few of his pieces were known. Some of his works were shown in Tondo Theatre, owned by Dominos Celis.

=== Poetry ===
- "Singsing ng Pag-ibig" (also known as "Ah...! Sayang Na Sayang")
- "Awa ng Pag-ibig" (also known as "Oh...! Kaawa-awang Buhay")

=== Metrical romances ===
- Clarita
- Adela at Florante
- Floro at Clavela
- Doce Pares de Francia
- Rodrigo de Villas

=== Comedia ===
- La Guerra Civil de Granada (The Civil War of Granada)
- Hernandez at Galisandra
- Reina Encantada ó Casamiento por Fuerza (Enchanted Queen or Marriage for Force)
- Los Dos Virreyes ó la Copa de Oro
- Principe Baldovino
- Conde Rodrigo de Villas
- Doce Pares de Francia
- El Amor y la Envidia (Love and Envy)
- Don Gonzalo de Cordoba
- Jason at Medea

== Sources ==
- (in Tagalog) Mga Dakilang Pilipino, ni Jose N. Sevilla sa Project Gutenberg
- (in Tagalog) Jose de la Cruz (Huseng Sisiw).
- Manuel, E. Arsenio. Dictionary of Philippine Biography, Volume 1. Quezon City: Filipiniana Publications, 1955.
