= Rémy Noë =

British painter

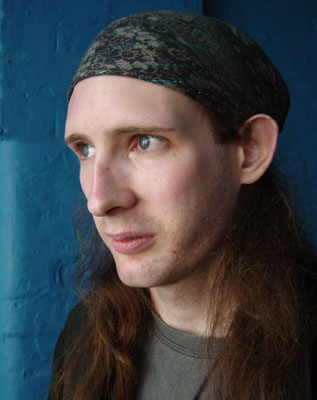
- Born: 8 December 1974; Bromley, Kent, England
- Known for: Painting
- Movement: Stuckism

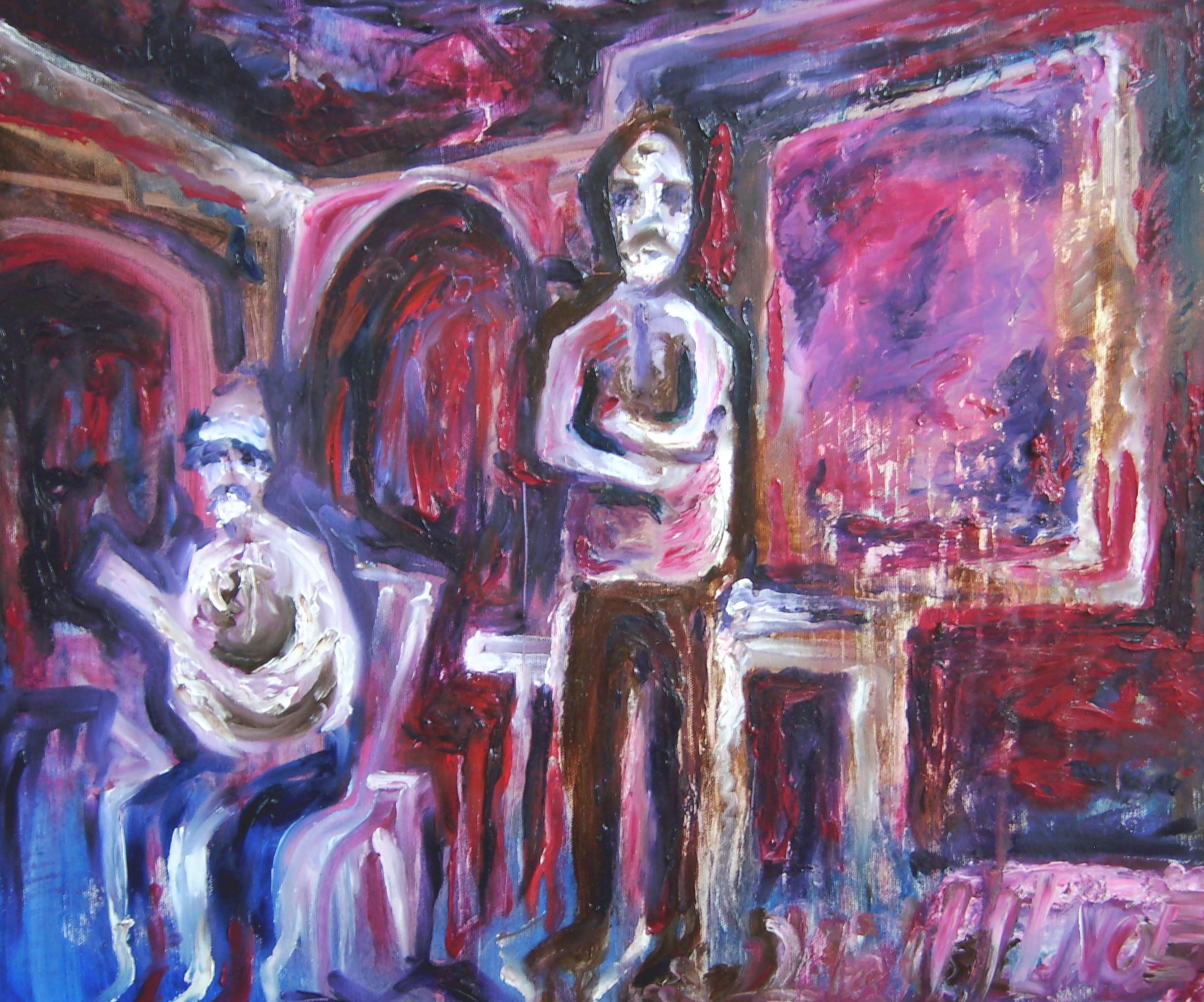
"Bill Lewis" by Rémy Noë

Rémy Noë (born 8 December 1974), is a British painter, a member of the international art movement Stuckism and co-founder of the Maidstone Stuckists.

== Life and work ==
Rémy Noë was born in Bromley, Kent, England, to a French and Dutch father and English mother, but has lived in Medway for most of their life. From 1986 to 1993, he attended Vinters Boys School, described as "a living hell", and Chatham Grammar School for Boys. 1993-97, attended Canterbury College of Art for Foundation and BA in Fine Art, but was forced to leave by the Department of Social Security. From 1997 to 1998, resumed a part-time BA, but was expelled for condemning "conceptual shit" and also threatened with arrest. Since then, Noë has worked in their father's garage, Medway Citroen. During this time they returned to studies at Canterbury Christ Church College, and obtained a Master in Fine Arts degree in 2011.

In 1996, Noë's work was first publicly exhibited in Indo Gothic, in Chatham, Kent. In 2000, took part in the first Stuckist demonstration against the Turner Prize outside Tate Britain. In 2001 founded the Maidstone Stuckists group and was exhibited in the Vote Stuckist show that year. There were staged fourteen shows of the Maidstone Stuckists works in various venues, including pubs, libraries and the Maidstone Music School, as well as arranging expeditions of the group for "painting, inspiration and getting drunk". In 2004, Noë's work was included in The Stuckists Punk Victorian at the Walker Art Gallery for the 2004 Liverpool Biennial.

Noë has a hatred of cities, but does frequent Gothic nightclubs in London, and likes to spend time exploring Kent and researching European mythology. Norse and Anglo-Saxon mythology are recurring themes in paintings, as are historical sites and the countryside in Kent. The use of sacred geometry and their own form of aesthetic geometry are features in the work. The colour and texture of some work "evokes a kind of modern Impressionism."

== Notes and references ==
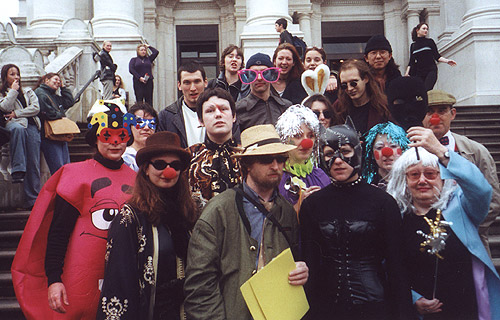
Rémy Noë (dark glasses, background right) at the first Stuckist demonstration against the Turner Prize, 2000
