= Tayfun Sönmez =

American economist

- Born: Tayfun Sönmez; Turkey
- Citizenship: Turkish-American

Academic background
- Education: Bilkent University; University of Rochester
- Doctoral advisor: William Thomson

Academic work
- Discipline: Game theory, market design, microeconomic theory
- Institutions: Boston College
- Notable ideas: Market design
- Awards: Social Choice and Welfare Prize (2008)
- Website: www.tayfunsonmez.net; Information at IDEAS / RePEc

Tayfun Sönmez is a Turkish-American professor of economics at Boston College. He is a Fellow of the Econometric Society and the 2008 winner of the Social Choice and Welfare Prize, which honors scholars under the age of 40 for excellent accomplishment in the area of social choice theory and welfare economics. Sönmez has made significant contributions in the areas of microeconomic theory, mechanism/market design, and game theory. His work has been featured by the U.S. National Science Foundation for its practical relevance.

== Work ==
Sönmez's early work studied the mathematical properties of allocation systems without transfers. His PhD dissertation established the relationship between the core and strategy-proof mechanisms. He was awarded University of Rochester's Conibear Prize as a graduate student for the best third-year paper. Following his first job at the University of Michigan, Sönmez identified a connection between the housing market model of Lloyd Shapley and Herbert Scarf and the house allocation model of Hylland and Richard Zeckhauser in a 1999 paper on House Allocation with Existing Tenants.

=== Student Assignment and School Choice ===
Sönmez's work involves a mix of theoretical and applied topics. He launched a research program studying the mechanism design aspects of student assignment systems. His 1999 article with Michel Balinski analyzes the connection between David Gale and Lloyd Shapley's college admissions model and priority based resource allocation problems. A subsequent paper with Atila Abdulkadiroglu defines the school choice problem and documents how many U.S. cities are using assignment mechanisms with undesirable properties. This paper has since become his most widely cited work. Sönmez's interest in policy issues developed from his initial academic work on school choice. A 2003 Boston Globe article "School assignment flaws detailed: Two economists study problem, offer relief" described the failings of the mechanism to the general public and lead to his involvement in changing the mechanism. Working together with Atila Abdulkadiroglu, Parag Pathak and Alvin E. Roth, the team of economists identified parents in Boston who developed heuristics on how to play this real-world game so that their children would not be unassigned, leaving those unaware of these features disadvantaged. The policy change was the first time an incentive compatible strategyproof mechanism, based on an abstract concept from mechanism design, played a role in a public policy discussion. Beginning in 2003, Boston held city-wide discussions and hearings on the school selection system and finally in 2005 narrowed the choice to one of two mechanisms initially proposed by Abdulkadiroglu and Sönmez: the top trading cycles mechanism for schools and the student-optimal stable mechanism based on the stable marriage problem. Eventually, Boston adopted the student-optimal stable mechanism.

Since then, a number of other districts have abandoned Boston's old mechanism. In 2007, through an act of Parliament, British authorities outlawed the use of First Preference First arrangements, which made Boston's old method of school assignment illegal throughout 150 English districts. Sönmez continues to be involved with the Boston school choice plan, including the most recent changes to the school choice plan in 2013.

=== Centralized Kidney Exchange ===
Sönmez was a founder of the New England Program for Kidney Exchange (NEPKE) along with Alvin E. Roth and Utku Ünver. The program was initially designed to operate primarily through the use of two pairs of incompatible donors. Each donor was incompatible with her partner but could be compatible with another donor who was likewise incompatible with his partner, allowing for trade. Because the National Organ Transplant Act of 1984 forbids the creation of binding contracts for organ transplant, the procedure had to be performed roughly simultaneously. Two pairs of patients means four operating rooms and four surgical teams acting in concert with each other. Hospitals and professionals in the transplant community initially felt that the practical burden of allowing three pairwise exchanges would be too large. However, research by Roth, Sönmez, and Ünver revealed that the efficiency loss from the lack of three pair exchanges are considerable.

Before that, paired kidney exchanges were conducted a handful of times in the US and new national programs were starting to pop up in South Korea and the Netherlands. Only 31 patients had received living donation through kidney exchanges in the US by the end of 2003 since the first kidney exchange in the world conducted by Dr. Park in Hanyang University in South Korea in 1991.

Roth, Sönmez, and Ünver partnered with Dr. Michael Rees to support Alliance for Paired Donation in 2005, which adopted their mechanisms and software. In this program, besides incorporating three-way exchanges, they incorporated and advocated for altruistic-donor chains, in which a Good Samaritan donor donates to the patient of first pair and the donor of the first pair donates to the patient of the second pair. In return the donor of the second pair donates to the patient of a third pair and the chain goes on as long as it could. These chains as of 2020 make up most of the kidney exchanges in the US.

NEPKE was chosen as the regional coordinator between UNOS and transplant centers to start off the UNOS national kidney exchange pilot program, which was established in 2010, and then dissolved itself in favor of the UNOS program in 2011.
