= Fuhito Kojima =

Japanese economist

- 小島 武仁
- Fuhito Kojima, Associate Professor of Stanford University, received Japan Academy Medal on 2019.
- Born: August 28, 1979 (age 47)

Academic background
- Education: Harvard University (Ph.D. 2008); University of Tokyo (B.A. 2003)
- Doctoral advisor: Alvin E. Roth

Academic work
- Discipline: Microeconomic theory Game theory Market design Political economics
- Institutions: University of Tokyo; Stanford University
- Awards: Social Choice and Welfare Prize (2016)

Fuhito Kojima (小島 武仁, Kojima Fuhito; born August 28, 1979) is a Japanese economist and a professor at the University of Tokyo.

== Career ==
He received a B.A. from University of Tokyo in 2003 and a Ph.D. from Harvard University in 2008.

== Fellowships and awards ==
- 2008–2011, Fellow, VCASI.
- 2013–2015, Sloan Research Fellow.
- 2014–present, SIEPR Fellow.
- 2015–present, Economic Theory Fellow.
- 2016, Social Choice and Welfare Prize.
- 2021, Nakahara Prize

== Published works ==
=== Papers ===
- Kojima, Fuhito (2006). "Stability and instability of the unbeatable strategy in dynamic processes". International Journal of Economic Theory. 2 (1): 41–53. doi:10.1111/j.1365-2966.2006.0023.x.
- Kojima, Fuhito (2006). "Risk-dominance and perfect foresight dynamics in N-player games". Journal of Economic Theory. 128 (1): 255–273. CiteSeerX 10.1.1.190.1896. doi:10.1016/j.jet.2005.01.006.
- Hatfield, John William; Kojima, Fuhito (2008). "Matching with Contracts: Comment". American Economic Review. 98 (3): 1189–1194. doi:10.1257/aer.98.3.1189. JSTOR 29730113.
- Kojima, Fuhito; Takahashi, Satoru (2008). "p-Dominance and perfect foresight dynamics". Journal of Economic Behavior & Organization. 67 (3–4): 689–701. doi:10.1016/j.jebo.2007.07.002.
- Kojima, Fuhito; Pathak, Parag A. (2009). "Incentives and Stability in Large Two-Sided Matching Markets". American Economic Review. 99 (3): 608–627. CiteSeerX 10.1.1.483.8284. doi:10.1257/aer.99.3.608. hdl:1721.1/61663. JSTOR 25592476.
- Kojima, Fuhito; Manea, Mihai (2010). "Incentives in the probabilistic serial mechanism" (PDF). Journal of Economic Theory. 145 (1): 106–123. CiteSeerX 10.1.1.190.3946. doi:10.1016/j.jet.2009.09.002.
- Kojima, Fuhito; Manea, Mihai (2010). "Axioms for Deferred Acceptance". Econometrica. 78 (2): 633–653. CiteSeerX 10.1.1.180.3407. doi:10.3982/ECTA7443. JSTOR 40664486.
- Che, Yeon-Koo; Kojima, Fuhito (2010). "Asymptotic equivalence of probabilistic serial and random priority mechanisms" (PDF). Econometrica. 78 (5): 1625–1672. CiteSeerX 10.1.1.183.6903. doi:10.3982/ECTA8354. JSTOR 40928968. S2CID 600141.
- Hatfield, John William; Kojima, Fuhito (2010). "Substitutes and stability for matching with contracts" (PDF). Journal of Economic Theory. 145 (5): 1704–1723. CiteSeerX 10.1.1.534.2009. doi:10.1016/j.jet.2010.01.007.
- Budish, Eric; Che, Yeon-Koo; Kojima, Fuhito; Milgrom, Paul (2013). "Designing Random Allocation Mechanisms: Theory and Applications". American Economic Review. 103 (2): 585–623. CiteSeerX 10.1.1.649.5582. doi:10.1257/aer.103.2.585.
- Kojima, Fuhito; Pathak, Parag A.; Roth, Alvin E. (2013). "Matching with Couples: Stability and Incentives in Large Markets". Quarterly Journal of Economics. 128 (4): 1585–1632. doi:10.1093/qje/qjt019. hdl:1721.1/96158.
- Kamada, Yuichiro; Kojima, Fuhito (2015). "Efficient Matching Under Distributional Constraints: Theory and Applications" (PDF). American Economic Review. 105 (1): 67–99. doi:10.1257/aer.20101552.
