= Parag Pathak =

American economist

Parag A. Pathak
- Born: June 8, 1980 (age 46); Corning, New York, U.S.

Academic background
- Education: Harvard University (BA, MA, PhD)
- Doctoral advisor: Alvin E. Roth

Academic work
- Discipline: Market design Microeconomics; Game theory
- Institutions: Massachusetts Institute of Technology
- Doctoral students: Gabriel Carroll
- Awards: Social Choice and Welfare Prize (2016); John Bates Clark Medal (2018)
- Website: Information at IDEAS / RePEc

Parag A. Pathak (born June 8, 1980) is Professor of Economics at the Massachusetts Institute of Technology and is affiliated with the National Bureau of Economic Research where he co-founded and directs the working group on market design. He was elected a Member of the National Academy of Sciences in 2025.

== Biography ==
Pathak grew up in Corning, New York. His parents emigrated to the United States from Kathmandu, Nepal. Pathak was educated at Harvard University where he received bachelor's and master's degrees in applied mathematics, summa cum laude, and PhD in business economics in 2007 with the support of The Paul & Daisy Soros Fellowships for New Americans. From 2002 to 2003, Pathak served as a visiting fellow at the University of Toulouse where he studied under Jean Tirole, the 2014 winner of the Nobel Memorial Prize in Economic Sciences. Pathak served as a Junior Fellow at the Harvard Society of Fellows. He joined the MIT faculty in 2008, and was voted tenure two years later in 2010 at the age of 30.

At MIT, Pathak co-founded and serves as Director of the School Effectiveness & Inequality Initiative, a group of economists who study the economics of education and the connections between human capital and the American income distribution.

Pathak is an Alfred P. Sloan Fellow and a recipient of a 2012 Presidential Early Career for Scientists and Engineers by the White House Office of Science and Technology Policy. In 2012, he was selected to give the Shapley Lecture, a lecture in honor of Lloyd Shapley given by a distinguished game theorist aged 40 or under at the 4th World Congress of the Game Theory Society. In 2018 he was named one of "the decade's eight best young economists" by The Economist and awarded the John Bates Clark Medal, for his work that "blends institutional knowledge, theoretical sophistication, and careful empirical analysis to provide insights that are of immediate value to important public-policy issues."

== Work ==
=== Market design ===
Pathak is best known for his work in market design. As a graduate student, he worked together with Atila Abdulkadiroglu, Alvin E. Roth, and Tayfun Sönmez to design a new student assignment system for Boston Public Schools, which was adopted in 2005. The team of economists identified parents in Boston who developed heuristics on how to play this real-world game so that their children would not be unassigned, leaving those unaware of these features disadvantaged.

Boston held citywide discussions and hearings on the school selection system and finally in 2005 narrowed the choice to one of two mechanisms: the top trading cycles mechanism for schools and the student-optimal stable mechanism based on the stable marriage problem. Eventually, Boston adopted the student-optimal stable mechanism. The policy change was the first time an incentive compatible strategyproof mechanism, based on an abstract concept from mechanism design, played a role in a public policy discussion.

He also worked with Abdulkadiroglu and Roth to design the algorithm underlying the system used to match New York City public school students to high schools as incoming freshman. The Boston and New York reforms were recognized as part of the 2012 Nobel Memorial Prize in Economic Sciences awarded to Alvin E. Roth and Lloyd Shapley for the theory of stable allocations and the practice of market design.

Pathak continues to be involved with the Boston school choice plan. In 2012, Boston Mayor Thomas Menino commissioned Pathak's lab to write a report alternative zone configurations in the choice plan, including a return to neighborhood schools. This frustrated some groups because it delayed citywide discussions about Boston's choice plan. After the report was released, some parent groups were unhappy even though it made no recommendations. In 2013, the school committee adopted a proposal developed by one of Pathak's graduate students, Peng Shi. The proposal was controversial and seen as complicated. Nonetheless, members of the Boston school committee voted for it because it was the best compromise between competing objectives.

Together with Abdulkadiroglu, Pathak was also part of a team that helped to design the OneApp common enrollment system used in the Recovery School District in New Orleans in 2011, involving a collaboration of assignment processes between charter schools and traditional public schools.

=== Education reform ===
Aside from his work on market design, Pathak is also a leading scholar in education reform. Together with Joshua Angrist, he is most well known for numerous studies of charter schools which use randomness in assignment lotteries to deal with differences between charter and traditional students. One study compares Boston's charter, pilot and traditional schools, and finds Boston's charter schools to be unusually effective. A report by the Boston Teachers Union criticized the report, claiming that they could not generalize the methodology to less-popular schools without waiting lists.

He was also part of the team that conducted the first lottery-based study of a KIPP charter school. Work with Joshua Angrist and Christopher Walters found that charter schools outside of urban areas are not particularly effective. Another study considers the effects of Boston's charter schools on college enrollment and persistence.

With Atila Abdulkadiroglu and Joshua Angrist, Pathak coauthored a more controversial study that examined the effects of Boston and New York's exam schools (Stuyvesant High School, Brooklyn Tech, Bronx Science, Boston Latin School, Boston Latin Academy, John D. O'Bryant School). Because students are admitted to those schools solely using a standardized test, Pathak and his coauthors assumed that students slightly above and below the admission cutoff were academically similar prior to attendance at an exam school. After comparing the two cohorts after the completion of high school, the study found that attending a highly selective exam school had no impact on standardized test performance or college admissions, and that the supposed academic benefit of attending those schools was the result of selection bias (schools admitting previously talented students) rather than education quality.

=== Other ===
Pathak has also studied the effect of home foreclosures on home prices in their surrounding neighborhood. This work has been cited in congressional testimony and featured in several outlets including PBS and NPR.

Awards
| Preceded by Dave Donaldson | Recipient of the John Bates Clark Medal; 2018 | Succeeded by Emi Nakamura |
