= Alvin E. Roth =

American economist (born 1951)

Alvin Roth
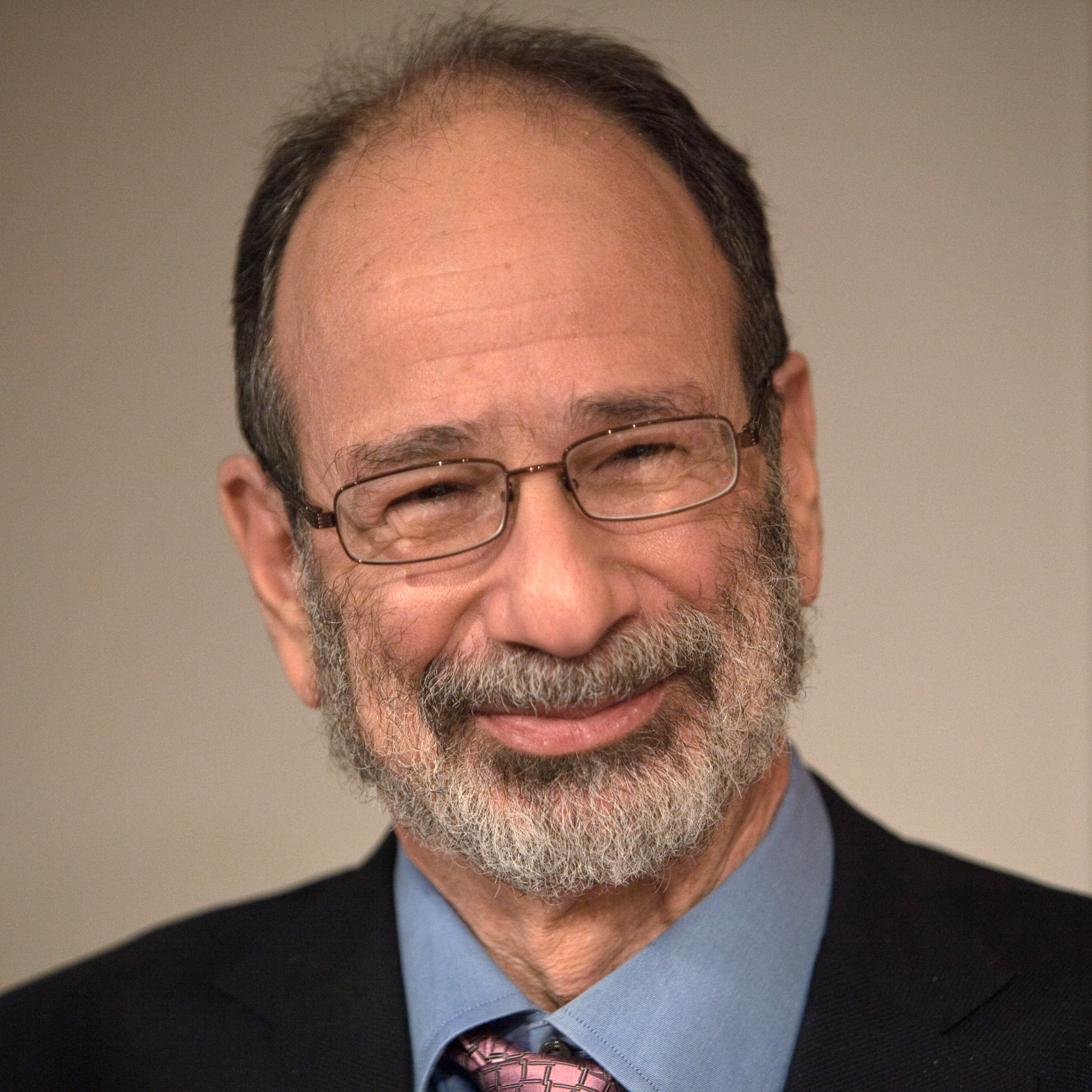
- Roth in 2012
- Born: Alvin Eliot Roth; December 18, 1951 (age 74); New York City, New York, U.S.
- Children: Aaron Roth

Academic background
- Education: Columbia University (BS); Stanford University (PhD)
- Thesis: Topics in Cooperative Game Theory (1974)
- Doctoral advisor: Robert B. Wilson

Academic work
- Discipline: Game theory, market design, experimental economics
- Institutions: Stanford University; Harvard University; University of Pittsburgh
- Doctoral students: Muriel Niederle; Georg Weizsäcker; Parag Pathak; Fuhito Kojima
- Notable ideas: Market design
- Awards: Frederick W. Lanchester Prize (1990); Nobel Memorial Prize in Economic Sciences (2012); Golden Goose Award (2013); Member of the National Academy of Sciences (2013)
- Website: Information at IDEAS / RePEc

Alvin Eliot Roth (born December 18, 1951) is an American academic and economist. He is the Craig and Susan McCaw professor of economics at Stanford University and the Gund professor of economics and business administration emeritus at Harvard University. He was president of the American Economic Association in 2017.

Roth has made significant contributions to the fields of game theory, market design and experimental economics, and is known for his emphasis on applying economic theory to solutions for "real-world" problems.

In 2012, he won the Nobel Memorial Prize in Economic Sciences jointly with Lloyd Shapley "for the theory of stable allocations and the practice of market design".

== Biography ==
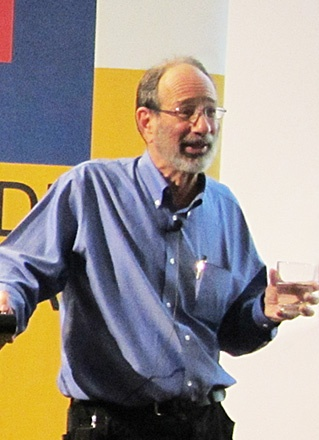
Al Roth, Sydney Ideas lecture 2012

Alvin Roth was born in the New York City borough of Queens to Ernest and Lillian Roth, who were both public high school teachers and Jewish. Roth followed his brother Ted Roth in attending the Science Honors Program at Columbia University, which offered classes to junior high school and high school students on Saturdays and entered Columbia's engineering school in the Fall of 1968 when he was 16, without having graduated from high school.

Roth graduated from Columbia University's School of Engineering and Applied Science in 1971 with a bachelor's degree in Operations Research. He then moved to Stanford University, receiving both his Master's and PhD also in Operations Research there in 1973 and 1974 respectively.

After leaving Stanford, Roth went on to teach at the University of Illinois at Urbana–Champaign, which he left in 1982 to become the Andrew W. Mellon professor of economics at the University of Pittsburgh. While at Pittsburgh, he also served as a fellow in the university's Center for Philosophy of Science and as a professor in the Katz Graduate School of Business. In 1998, Roth left to join the faculty at Harvard where he remained until deciding to return to Stanford in 2012. In 2013 he became a full member of the Stanford faculty and took emeritus status at Harvard.

Roth is an Alfred P. Sloan fellow, a Guggenheim fellow, and a fellow of the American Academy of Arts and Sciences. He is also a member of the National Bureau of Economic Research (NBER) and the Econometric Society. In 2013, Roth, Shapley, and David Gale won a Golden Goose Award for their work on market design. A collection of Roth's papers is housed at the Rubenstein Library at Duke University.

== Academic work ==
In October 2012, Roth was the co-recipient of the 2012 Nobel Memorial Prize in Economic Sciences, together with Lloyd S. Shapley, The Royal Swedish Academy of Sciences stated that it awarded the Nobel Memorial Prize jointly to Roth and Shapley "for the theory of stable allocations and the practice of market design."

The citation went on to say:

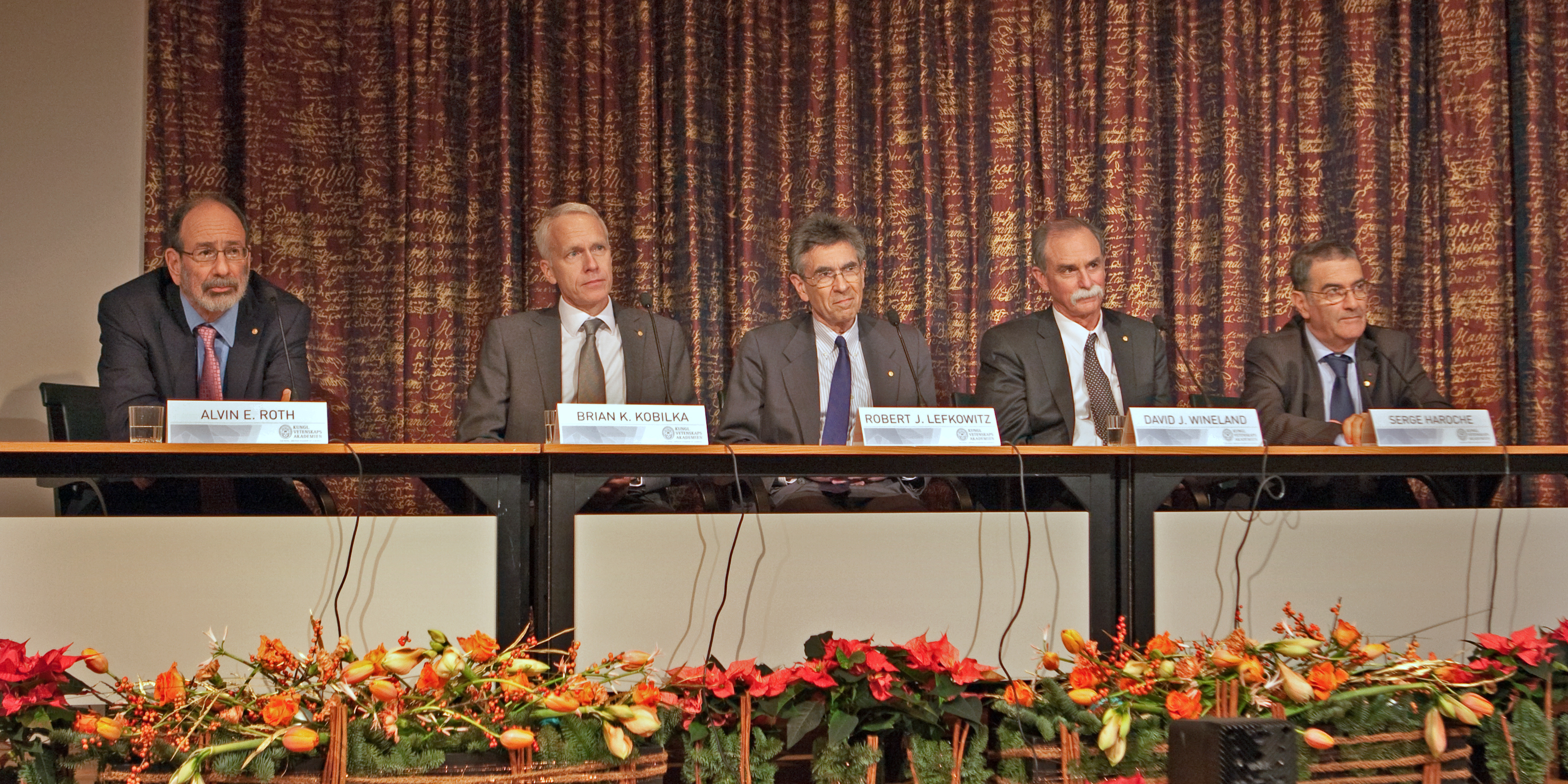
Nobel laureates of 2012 during the ceremony: Alvin E. Roth, Brian Kobilka, Robert J. Lefkowitz, David J. Wineland and Serge Haroche

Alvin Roth recognized that Shapley's theoretical results could clarify the functioning of important markets in practice. In a series of empirical studies, Roth and his colleagues demonstrated that stability is the key to understanding the success of particular market institutions. Roth was later able to substantiate this conclusion in systematic laboratory experiments. He also helped redesign existing institutions for matching new doctors with hospitals, students with schools, and organ donors with patients. These reforms are all based on the Gale-Shapley algorithm, along with modifications that take into account specific circumstances and ethical restrictions, such as the preclusion of side payments.

=== Market design ===
Roth made several fundamental contributions to market design since the 1990s on topics including kidney exchange, school choice, medical residency match, entry-level job market for economists and other markets. Describing the dynamism of market design, Roth suggests that "As the conditions of the market change, the behavior of people change and that causes old rules to be discarded and new rules to be created."

Roth is also an active blogger on topics related to market design: he manages the Market Design Blog.

==== Kidney exchange ====
Roth (left), observing a kidney transplantation made possible by kidney exchange

Roth did foundational theoretical work on kidney exchange along with Tayfun Sonmez and Utku Unver, and later on with Itai Ashlagi and other co-authors. Roth, along with Tayfun Sonmez and Utku Unver, were one of the first to note the similarity between kidney exchange and one-sided matching described by Lloyd Shapley and Herbert Scarf. They adapted David Gale's top-trading-cycle algorithm to allow the one-sided matching with waiting-list options, and proposed efficient and incentive-compatible chain selection rules. The same team subsequently showed that efficient outcomes with good incentive properties can be found in computationally efficient ways when only pairwise kidney exchanges are considered.

==== New England Program for Kidney Exchange ====
Roth is a co-founder of the New England Program for Kidney Exchange, a registry and matching program that pairs compatible kidney donors and recipients.

The program was designed to operate primarily through the use of two pairs of incompatible donors. Each donor was incompatible with her partner but could be compatible with another donor who was likewise incompatible with his partner. Francis Delmonico, a transplant surgeon at Harvard Medical School, describes a typical situation,

Kidney exchange enables transplantation where it otherwise could not be accomplished. It overcomes the frustration of a biological obstacle to transplantation. For instance, a wife may need a kidney and her husband may want to donate, but they have a blood type incompatibility that makes donation impossible. Now they can do an exchange. And we've done them. Now we are working on a three-way exchange.

Because the National Organ Transplant Act forbids the creation of binding contracts for organ transplant, steps in the procedure had to be performed roughly simultaneously. Two pairs of patients means four operating rooms and four surgical teams acting in concert with each other. Hospitals and professionals in the transplant community felt that the practical burden of three pairwise exchanges would be too large. While the original theoretical work discovered that an "efficient frontier" would be reached with exchanges between three pairs of otherwise incompatible donors, it was determined that the goals of the program would not be sacrificed by limiting exchanges to pairs of incompatible donors. A 12-party (6 donors and 6 recipients) kidney exchange was performed in April 2008.

==== Global Kidney Exchange ====
Along with his long-time collaborator Dr Michael Rees, Roth introduced the idea of global kidney exchange. Global kidney exchange is kidney exchange conducted between patients from different countries. Such exchange is especially beneficial when the cost of hemodialysis in the developed world exceeds that of kidney transplantation by an amount greater than the combined cost of transplantation, subsequent immunosuppression, and medical follow-up for a donor–recipient pair from a developing world country. Roth, Rees and other co-authors proposed the implementation of global kidney exchange programs that leverage the cost savings achieved through earlier transplantation over dialysis for the developed-world kidney transplant candidates to fund the cost of kidney exchange between developed-world patient–donor pairs with immunological barriers and developing-world patient–donor pairs with financial barriers. The first such exchange was carried out in 2015.

Roth and coauthors have continued to contribute to ethical discussions and to practical operational designs that can facilitate global kidney chains. In 2021, a kidney exchange was conducted between Israel and the UAE where Roth and his colleagues like Dr Michael Rees and Itai Ashlagi played key roles.

==== School choice ====
Roth helped redesign mechanisms for matching students to New York City high schools and Boston primary schools.

===== New York City public school system =====
Roth later helped design the market to match New York City public school students to high schools as incoming freshmen. Previously, the school district had students mail in a list of their five preferred schools in rank order, then mailed a photocopy of that list to each of the five schools. As a result, schools could tell whether or not students had listed them as their first choice. This meant that some students really had a choice of one school, rather than five. It also meant that students had an incentive to hide their true preferences. Roth and his colleagues Atila Abdulkadiroğlu and Parag Pathak proposed David Gale and Lloyd Shapley's incentive-compatible student-proposing deferred acceptance algorithm to the school board in 2003. The school board accepted the measure as the method of selection for New York City public school students.

===== Boston's public school system =====
Working with Atila Abdulkadiroğlu, Parag A. Pathak, and Tayfun Sonmez, Roth presented a similar measure to Boston's public school system in 2003. Here the Boston system gave so much preference to an applicant's first choice that were a student to not receive her first or second choice, it was likely that she would not be matched with any school on her list and be administratively assigned to schools which had vacancies. Some Boston parents had informally recognized this feature of the system and developed detailed lists in order to avoid having their children administratively assigned. Boston held public hearings on the school selection system and finally in 2005 settled on David Gale and Lloyd Shapley's incentive-compatible student-proposing deferred acceptance algorithm.

==== National Medical Residency Match ====
Roth's 1984 paper on the National Resident Matching Program (NRMP) highlighted the system designed by John Stalknaker and F. J. Mullen in 1952. The system was built on theoretical foundations independently introduced by David Gale and Lloyd Shapley in 1962. Roth proved that the mechanism used in NRMP was both stable and strategy-proof for unmarried medical residents but deferred to future study the question of how to match married couples efficiently.

In 1990s, Roth redesigned the matching program to, among other things, produce stable matches efficiently even with married couples. Along with Elliott Peranson, Roth proposed a variation of the applicant-proposing deferred-acceptance algorithm modified to accommodate couples by resolving potential instabilities caused by the presence of couples sequentially, following the instability-chaining algorithm proposed by Roth and John H. Vande Vate. The NRMP adopted the new algorithm in 1997. The algorithm is still in use in NRMP as of 2021. Moreover, it has been adopted in entry-level labor markets for other organizations such as the Association of Psychology Postdoctoral and Internship Centers.

==== Organ Donation ====
In a series of papers with Judd Kessler, Roth investigates economic and psychological forces that influence organ donation decisions. They investigate how changes in the management of organ waiting lists and donor registration programs might impact donations. A notable insight from this work suggest that organ allocation policy giving priority on waiting lists to those who previously registered as donors has a significant positive impact on registration. In another paper, Roth and Kessler found that giving potential donors more opportunities to donate organs while providing them with more information can increase registrations.

==== Entry-level job market for economists ====
In 2005, the American Economic Association (AEA) asked Roth to chair a new Ad Hoc Committee on the job market for economists. The committee's goal was to assess whether the AEA could better promote a thick market for new Ph.D.s in economics, while reducing problems of congestion and coordination failure, factors previously identified as crucial for successful market design.

Around 1970, many departments of economics did not advertise assistant professor positions. Instead, jobs were filled by word of mouth and through letters of inquiry, and the market was relatively thin. Since 1974 the AEA helped make the market thicker by publishing Job Openings for Economists (JOE), initially as a hardcopy periodical and since 2002 exclusively online. The annual Allied Social Science Associations January meetings also became a central venue for conducting interviews. By the 2000s, the number of jobs and candidates had made fairly thick markets possible, and the market had to deal with the congestion caused by the many possibilities to be considered for both employers and applicants alike.

The work of the Committee resulted in the introduction of two market design interventions: First, in early December prior to the January Allied Social Science Associations meeting, applicants have the option of sending no more than two signals of special interest to employers through the AEA signaling service. The signals are meant to let candidates credibly express interest in employers, and to help employers identify candidates interested in their positions. Second, during the late stages of the interviewing and hiring processes, some employers may not have hired any of the candidates they interviewed, and candidates may find that all the prospective employers with whom they interviewed have hired someone else. To address this problem, in March, applicants still looking for jobs and employers with unfilled jobs may indicate their continued availability on the AEA scramble website.

In a study of data from the initial four years of the signal and scramble mechanisms, Roth and coauthors found that sending a signal increased the probability of receiving an interview by 6.8 percentage points, on average. Moreover, they also found that at least 10 percent of the jobs listed in the scramble were filled through the contacts facilitated by the scramble.

==== Market Timing ====
Roth, along with Xiaolin Xing, wrote two important papers that extended our understanding of the timing of transactions. In one paper, they explored how strategic incentives can lead market participants to cause unraveling when the hiring side of a market makes offers further in advance of employment to pre-empt their competitors. In another, they studied the environment where transactions take time to evaluate and complete, causing markets to be congested.

In a series of papers with Axel Ockenfels, Roth studied auction bidding behavior on eBay and found that a very high proportion of the bids were submitted in the very last minute or seconds of the auction. They highlighted how eBay's design when the study was conducted, which included a fixed ending time, gave bidders incentives to delay placing their bids, and they showed how sniping can be prevented in auctions that end with a soft-close.

==== Repugnance ====
In an article in the Journal of Economic Perspectives titled "Repugnance as a Constraint on Markets" Roth "introduced in the economics literature the concept of 'repugnance' for a transaction as the aversion toward other individuals engaging in it, even if the parties directly involved benefit from that trade (i.e. "There are some things no one should be allowed to do"). Repugnance considerations have important consequences on the types of markets and transactions that we observe and, as such, they impose a challenge for policy and market design."

Roth himself stated that: "We need to understand better and engage more with the phenomenon of 'repugnant transactions,' which, I will argue, often serves as an important constraint on markets and market design." Roth has published on the topic across top economics, medical, social science, philosophy, and ethics journals. A lot of Roth's focus in this area has been focused on the ethical implications of kidney exchange and compensation for organ donors and their families. Roth has also conducted a cross-jurisdiction study on relationships between repugnance and regulation of transactions.

The notion of repugnance has subsequently been explored in works that has attempted to understand the origin of this repugnance for the market.

=== Experimental economics ===
Roth is one of the early pioneers of experimental economics and has made several fundamental contributions to the field starting from the early 1970s. Roth's approach to experiments expanded the possibilities of economic experiments could be and ushered in an approach open to influence by other social sciences as well as game theory. Unlike earlier experimental work by Vernon Smith, Charles Plott, and others, Roth and his coauthors appealed to sociological and psychological concepts to explain how subjects deviated from rationally predicted outcomes right from the start. His early work "was rigorous in its specification of what economic models predicted and was rooted in formal economic theories, yet provided accurate and insightful descriptions of actual behavior based on psychology and sociology." The Scientific Background document for the 2012 Nobel Prize in Economics states:

Roth describes how laboratory experiments and field observations can interact with game theory, thereby establishing economics as a more satisfactory empirical science.

Besides contributing to some laboratory game designs that has become standard (for example, along with his early collaborator the psychologist J. Keith Murnighan, Roth designed a repeated-game experiment in which there was a fixed probability that each period of play would be the last, providing researchers with a tool to study infinitely repeated games in the laboratory). Roth has also outlined methodological issues that both producers and consumers of experimental research must consider in interpreting experimental results and published the full datasets of his experiments while the field was still in its nascency, laying the groundwork for much of the metascience debates regarding experiments in economics.

Roth also edited two volumes of the Handbook of Experimental Economics with John Kagel.

==== Bargaining ====
Along with some of his early collaborators in experimental economics, most notably Michael Malouf and J. Keith Murnighan, tested the predictions of cooperative bargaining theory in the laboratory. This work provided important empirical evidence to support the claim that cooperative bargaining models were useful to predict the qualitative effects of changes in risk aversion. Some of these experiments also highlighted the importance of focal-point effects and fairness concerns. Roth and Murnighan found that information asymmetry and communication structure are critical determinants of bargaining outcomes, and that while risk averse bargainers make concessions to resolve their aversion to risk, this is less harmful than what conventional economics predict in predictable contexts. Roth has also conducted a series of experiments to test the predictions of non-cooperative bargaining theory in collaboration with Jack Ochs.

Roth, along with Vesna Prasnikar, Masahiro Okuno-Fujiwara, and Shmuel Zamir, published an influential study to investigate bargaining across four different countries (Israel, Japan, USA, and the former Yugoslavia). This paper is one of the first experimental studies in economics to tackle cultural differences with data, and found no cultural differences in the markets, all of which converged to the predicted subgame perfect outcome. This influential paper has been selected one of the top 20 papers in experimental economics.

==== Reinforcement learning ====
A series of papers by Roth with Ido Erev demonstrates that the main deviations from rational choice in repeated choice tasks (including extensive form games, games with unique mixed strategy equilibrium, and decisions under uncertainty) can be predicted with surprisingly simple learning models.

==== Market design experiments ====
Along with coauthors like John Kagel, Muriel Niederle, and others, Roth had pioneered the use of experiments for practical market design. Roth and Kagel compared the algorithm used in clearinghouses in Edinburgh and Cardiff to assign entry-level doctors to positions with the stable deferred acceptance algorithm and provided empirical evidence that the latter did not suffer from unravelling – offering the first piece of experimental evidence that the stability of matching algorithm support a market plays a crucial role to the functioning of such market.

This line of research has been furthered with Roth's work with Muriel Niederle that helped shed light on how a matching market can collapse and its consequences, taking inspiration from the collapse of the gastroenterology fellowship in the United States. This and other work helped the American Gastroenterology Association reintroduce a deferred acceptance algorithm in 2006. Roth has also used experiments to evaluate the decision architecture and implications of matching markets including that of law clerk matching. Roth had also used laboratory experiments to study the regulation of transplant centers and organ procurement organizations with Alex Chan.

=== Game theory ===
Roth made several fundamental contributions to game theory on topics including Shapley Value, axiomatic bargaining, and matching theory.

==== Shapley value ====
Roth introduced a utility perspective on the Shapley value. Roth's key contribution is to show that a value can be viewed to represent a valuation or utility of a player regarding a cooperative interactive decision situation in which the player participates. Under this interpretation, a cooperative game describes the potential values that can be generated by the various coalitions of which the player is a member. This player evaluates this situation using a utility function, and the Shapley value can be interpreted as such a utility function – the Shapley value is the specific von Neumann–Morgenstern expected utility function that is neutral to ordinary as well as strategic risk.

==== Axiomatic bargaining ====
In 1978 Roth took a semester leave at the Economics Department at Stanford while being a faculty member at the University of Illinois, where he taught a course whose lecture notes became a textbook on axiomatic models of bargaining. Some economists have studied the effects of risk aversion on the bargaining solution. Compare two similar bargaining problems A and B, where the feasible space and the utility of player 1 remain fixed, but the utility of player 2 is different: player 2 is more risk-averse in A than in B. Then, the payoff of player 2 in the Nash bargaining solution is smaller in A than in B. However, this is true only if the outcome itself is certain; if the outcome is risky, then a risk-averse player may get a better deal as proved by Roth and Uriel Rothblum.

==== Matching theory ====
Roth has made several fundamental contributions to the theory of matching. Prominent examples include:

The core of housing market coincides with the unique competitive allocation: Roth and Postlewaite have shown that in markets with indivisible goods and private endowments ("housing markets") the core coincides with the unique competitive allocation. Their construction uses David Gale's top-trading-cycle algorithm (TTC), which was also used by Shapley and Scarf to prove the existence of a competitive allocation.

The rural hospital theorem, that states that the same positions are filled in all stable matchings, and that the set of matched agents is identical in all stable matchings. This theorem refuted suggestions that changing the way the National Residency Match Program treats medical graduates and hospitals may change the number of doctors assigned to rural hospitals.

Strategy-proofness of deferred acceptance and top-trading-cycle. Roth has shown that student-proposing deferred acceptance is weakly (group) strategy-proof – truthful reporting to the student-proposing deferred acceptance mechanism is a weakly dominant strategy and furthermore it cannot strictly benefit any coalition of manipulators. The same paper also shows that no stable matching mechanism makes truthful reporting dominant for both sides of the market. He was also the first to show that top-trading-cycle is strategy-proof.

In addition to these (and many other) contributions, Roth has co-authored with Marilda Sotomayor a book on two-sided matching. This book organized the knowledge that was available at that time, and set the agenda for research in matching theory in the following decades.

== Teaching ==
Roth has taught a variety of courses in Economics. In the early 2000s, together with Paul Milgrom, Roth taught the first graduate course on Market Design, which brought together topics on auctions, matching, and other related areas. The market design course has served as a basis for many similar graduate courses across the US and around the world, and has helped jump-start the field of Market Design.

Over his career, he had advised over four dozen doctoral students and about the same number of post-doctoral fellows. Many of his students have gone on to prolific research careers, and many has won major awards in the field including a John Bates Clark Medalist, a Nakahara Prize laureate, a Gottfried Wilhelm Leibniz Prize winner and an Oskar-Morgenstern Medalist. Roth has received teaching awards from University of Illinois, University of Pittsburgh, and Harvard University.

== Personal life ==
Roth is married to Dr Emilie Roth and has two sons. Emilie Roth is a psychologist specialized in cognitive engineering. His elder son, Aaron Roth, is the Henry Salvatori Professor of Computer and Cognitive Science at the University of Pennsylvania. As of 2023, his younger son, Ben Roth, is an associate professor of Business Administration at Harvard Business School.

== Books ==
Roth is the author of numerous scholarly articles, books, and other publications. A selection:

- 1979. Axiomatic Models of Bargaining, Lecture Notes in Economics and Mathematical Systems. Springer Verlag.
- 1985. Game-Theoretic Models of Bargaining, (editor) Cambridge University Press, 1985.
- 1987. Laboratory Experimentation in Economics: Six Points of View. (editor) Cambridge University Press. (Chinese translation, 2008)
- 1988. The Shapley Value: Essays in Honor of Lloyd S. Shapley. (editor) Cambridge University Press.
- 1990. Two-Sided Matching: A Study in Game-Theoretic Modeling and Analysis. With Marilda Sotomayor. Cambridge University Press.
- 1995. Handbook of Experimental Economics. Edited with J.H. Kagel. Princeton University Press.
- 2001. Game Theory in the Tradition of Bob Wilson. Edited with Bengt Holmstrom and Paul Milgrom.
- 2015. Who Gets What and Why. Eamon Dolan/Houghton Mifflin Harcourt.
- 2026: Moral Economics. Basic Venture.

== Journal articles ==
Roth has published over 200 articles in peer-reviewed journals. According to Google Scholar, the most widely cited have been:

- Erev, Ido; Roth, Alvin E. (1998). "Predicting how people play games: Reinforcement learning in experimental games with unique, mixed strategy equilibria". American Economic Review. 88 (4): 848–881. JSTOR 117009.
- Roth, Alvin E.; Erev, Ido (1995). "Learning in extensive-form games: Experimental data and simple dynamic models in the intermediate term". Games and Economic Behavior. 8 (1): 164–212. doi:10.1016/S0899-8256(05)80020-X.
- Roth, Alvin E.; Prasnikar, Vesna; Okuno-Fujiwara, Masahiro; Zamir, Shmuel (1991). "Bargaining and Market Behavior in Jerusalem, Ljubljana, Pittsburgh, and Tokyo: An Experimental Study". American Economic Review. 81 (5): 1068–1095. JSTOR 2006907.
- Roth, Alvin E. (1984). "The Evolution of the Labor Market for Medical Interns and Residents: A Case Study in Game Theory" (PDF). Journal of Political Economy. 92 (6): 991–1016. doi:10.1086/261272. JSTOR 1831989. S2CID 1360205.
- Roth, Alvin E.; Ockenfels, Axel (2002). "Last-Minute Bidding and the Rules for Ending Second-Price Auctions: Evidence from eBay and Amazon Auctions on the Internet". American Economic Review. 92 (4): 1093–1103. doi:10.1257/00028280260344632. JSTOR 3083298.
- Roth, Alvin E. (2002). "The Economist as Engineer: Game Theory, Experimentation, and Computation as Tools for Design Economics". Econometrica. 70 (4): 1341–1378. doi:10.1111/1468-0262.00335. JSTOR 3082001.
- Roth, Alvin E. (1982). "The Economics of Matching: Stability and Incentives". Mathematics of Operations Research. 7 (4): 617–628. doi:10.1287/moor.7.4.617.
- Roth, Alvin E.; Peranson, Elliott (1999). "The Redesign of the Matching Market for American Physicians: Some Engineering Aspects of Economic Design" (PDF). American Economic Review. 89 (4): 748–780. doi:10.1257/aer.89.4.748. JSTOR 117158. PMID 29115787. S2CID 14904630.
- Roth, Alvin E.; Sönmez, Tayfun; Ünver, M. Utku (2004). "Kidney Exchange". The Quarterly Journal of Economics. 119 (2): 457–488. doi:10.1162/0033553041382157.
- Abdulkadiroğlu, Atila; Pathak, Parag A.; Roth, Alvin E. (2005). "The New York City High School Match". American Economic Review. 95 (2): 364–367. doi:10.1257/000282805774670167.
- Haruvy, Ernan; Roth, Alvin E.; Ünver, M. Utku (2006). "The dynamics of law clerk matching: An experimental and computational investigation of proposals for reform of the market". Journal of Economic Dynamics and Control. 30 (3): 457–486. doi:10.1016/j.jedc.2005.02.002.

== Political views ==
In June 2024, 16 Nobel Prize in Economics laureates, including Roth, signed an open letter arguing that Donald Trump’s fiscal and trade policies coupled with efforts to limit the Federal Reserve's independence would reignite inflation in the United States.

== See also ==
- Market design
- Experimental economics
- Repugnant market
- Repugnancy costs
- List of Jewish Nobel laureates

Awards
Preceded by Thomas J. Sargent; Christopher A. Sims	Laureate of the Nobel Memorial Prize in Economics; 2012; Served alongside: Lloyd S. Shapley	Succeeded by Eugene F. Fama; Lars Peter Hansen; Robert J. Shiller
Academic offices
Preceded by Robert J. Shiller	President of the American Economic Association; 2017– 2018	Succeeded by Olivier Blanchard
