= Raúl Bladimiro Canelo Rabanal =

Peruvian lawyer, professor and legal writer

- Born: Raúl Bladimiro Canelo Rabanal; December 28, 1959 (age 65); Lima, Peru
- Citizenship: Peruvian
- Education: Pontifical Catholic University of Peru, National University of Rosario, National University of San Marcos, University of Alcalá, University of Salamanca
- Occupations: Lawyer, professor, legal writer
- Known for: Dean of the Lima Bar Association

Raúl Bladimiro Canelo Rabanal (born December 28, 1959) is a Peruvian lawyer, university professor and legal writer who has served as Dean of the Lima Bar Association since 2024. He is currently a university professor at the Faculty of Law of the University of Lima.

== Biography ==
He was born in the capital of Peru, Lima on December 28, 1959. He is the son of notary Wilson Canelo Ramirez and Delia Rabanal Cacho.

=== Education ===
He was graduated as a lawyer at the Pontifical Catholic University of Peru, obtained a master's degree in procedural law at the National University of Rosario and a doctorate in law and political science at the National University of San Marcos. He subsequently obtained a diploma in law at the University of Alcalá and a doctorate at the University of Salamanca.

== Career ==
In 1985 he was a member of the Lima Bar Association. He taught, was faculty secretary and general secretary at the Pontifical Catholic University of Peru. He was a legal and academic collaborator of Fernando De Trazegnies Granda, Jorge Avendaño Valdez, José Tola Pasquel, Hugo Sarabia, Salomon Lerner and Marcial Rubio. From the beginning of his university activity he had a relationship with the university professors Javier de Belaúnde López de Romaña, Jorge Rendón Vásquez and Marcial Rubio. Later, he collaborated with the drafting of the Civil Procedure Code of Peru, together with professors Juan Monroy, Nelson Ramirez and Guillermo Lohmann. During the government of Alberto Fujimori, he refused to be appointed as secretary of the Executive Council of the Judiciary due to political problems. In 1992 he was a member of the Board of Directors of the Lima Bar Association. After the constitutional collapse of 1992, he was appointed magistrate of the Superior Court of Lima. He is the founder of Estudio Raúl Canelo Abogados. He was elected Dean in the 2024-2025 elections. In 2022-2024 he was Secretary General of the Pan-American Institute of Procedural Law. He is a member of the Ibero-American Institute of Procedural Law.

== Books ==
- Título Preliminar y Derecho de las Personas: Enfoque Contemporáneo.
- La prueba en el derecho procesal. ISBN 9789972045493
- Derecho de Garantías Civiles y Comerciales. Doctrina, Legislación y Jurisprudencia.
