= Horace Mann Middle School =

Horace Mann Middle School or Horace Mann Junior High School may refer to:

- Horace Mann Junior High School, Chesterfield Square, Los Angeles
- Horace Mann Middle School, San Diego, California, a secondary school in San Diego
- Horace Mann Middle School (Denver, Colorado), a Denver Landmark
- Horace Mann Middle School, a Miami-Dade County public school, Florida
- Horace Mann Middle School, Brandon, Florida
- Horace Mann Middle School, a former school at the site of King Science and Technology Magnet Center, Omaha, Nebraska
- Horace Mann Junior High School, Baytown, Texas; part of the Goose Creek Consolidated Independent School District
- Horace Mann Middle School, Charleston, West Virginia
- Horace Mann Middle School, Sheboygan, Wisconsin; part of Sheboygan Area School District
- Horace Mann Middle School, Wausau, Wisconsin

== See also ==
- Horace Mann School (disambiguation)
- Horace Mann (disambiguation)
- Mann Arts and Science Magnet Middle School, Little Rock, Arkansas; formerly known as Horace Mann Junior High School
