= Horace Mann School (disambiguation) =

Horace Mann School is a highly selective independent college preparatory school in New York City

Horace Mann School may also refer to:

- Horace Mann Charter Schools in Massachusetts
- Mann Arts and Science Magnet Middle School, middle school in Little Rock, Arkansas
- Horace Mann School Beverly Hills, K-8 school in Beverly Hills, California
- Horace Mann Elementary School (Oak Park, Illinois)
- Horace Mann High School, a former school of the Gary Community School Corporation in Gary, Indiana
- Horace Mann School for the Deaf and Hard of Hearing, a pre-K-12 school in Allston (Boston), Massachusetts
- Barnstable Horace Mann Charter School, a 5-6 school in Marstons Mills, Massachusetts
- Horace Mann School (St. Louis, Missouri), a National Register of Historic Places (NRHP) listing in St. Louis, Missouri
- Horace Mann School (Schenectady, New York), NRHP-listed
- Horace Mann Junior High School, a junior high school in Kanawha City, West Virginia
- Horace Mann High School (North Fond du Lac, Wisconsin), North Fond du Lac, Wisconsin
- Horace Mann School (Saint Paul, Minnesota), an elementary school in Saint Paul, Minnesota
- Horace Mann K-8 Dual Language Magnet School, a K-8 school in Wichita, Kansas

== See also ==
- Horace Mann Middle School (disambiguation)
- Horace Mann (disambiguation)
