= Marilda =

Marilda is a feminine given name. Notable people with the name include:

- Marilda Julia (born 1965), Puerto Rican tennis player
- Marilda Sotomayor, Brazilian mathematician and economist
