= Jorge Sotomayor Tello =

Brazilian mathematician (1942–2022)

Jorge Manuel Sotomayor Tello
- Born: 25 March 1942; Lima, distrito de Rímac, Peru
- Died: 7 January 2022 (aged 79); Rio de Janeiro, Brazil
- Resting place: Memorial do Carmo, 285, Caju, Rio de Janeiro
- Other name: Soto
- Education: Universidad Nacional Mayor de San Marcos, Lima, Perú, Instituto Nacional de Matemática Pura e Aplicada, Rio de Janeiro, Brazil
- Known for: Principal configuration, curvature lines, umbilic points, structural stability of first order, bifurcations of codimension one, two and three.
- Spouse: Marilda Sotomayor
- Awards: National Order of Scientific Merit; Brazilian Academy of Sciences; Guggenheim Foundation
- Scientific career
- Fields: Differential equations, Dynamical Systems, Bifurcation Theory, Differential Equations of Classical Geometry
- Workplaces: Instituto Nacional de Matemática Pura e Aplicada; Universidade de São Paulo; Universidade Federal de Itajubá(Visiting Professor)
- Thesis: Estabilidade Estrutural de Primeira Ordem e Variedades de Banach (1964)
- Doctoral advisor: Maurício Peixoto
- Other academic advisors: José Tola Pasquel

Jorge Manuel Sotomayor Tello (25 March 1942 – 7 January 2022) was a Peruvian-born Brazilian mathematician who worked on differential equations, bifurcation theory, and differential equations of classical geometry.

He is one of five sons of Alfonso Sotomayor Ibarra, an accountant, and Clara Rosa Tello de Sotomayor. He was married to Marilda Antonia de Oliveira Sotomayor and had two children.

Sotomayor earned his Ph.D. from the IMPA in 1964 under the supervision of Maurício Peixoto at the age of 22.

In the dissertation Estabilidade Estrutural de Primeira Ordem e Variedades de Banach ("First order structural stability and Banach manifolds") he presented a geometric reinterpretation and extension of the fruitful notions and results relating bifurcations and stability that were introduced by A. A. Andronov and E. A. Leontovich.

Sotomayor visited the University of California at Berkeley during 1966–1968.

He was a recipient of Brazil's National Order of Scientific Merit in mathematics. From 1994 until his death in early 2022, he was a member of the Brazilian Academy of Sciences. He also was a Fellow of John Simon Guggenheim Memorial Foundation (1983).

Sotomayor is the author of the textbooks Lições de Equações Diferenciais Ordinárias, IMPA, Projeto Euclides, (1979), Singularidades de Aplicações Diferenciáveis, ELAM (1976) and Curvas Definidas por Equações Diferenciais no Plano, 13^{o} Colóquio Brasileiro de Matemática, IMPA, (1981). He also translated essays of Henri Poincaré into Portuguese, which were published in a book under the title Um Poeta, um Matemático e um Físico: Três Ensaios Biográficos por Henri Poincaré, EDUSP (2008).

He is also author of the books Lines of Curvature and Umbilical Points on Surfaces, 18^{o} CBM, Publicações Matemáticas, IMPA (1991) with Carlos Gutierrez, reprinted and updated as Structurally Configurations of Lines of Curvature and Umbilic Points on Surfaces, Lima, Monografias del IMCA, (1998) and Differential Equations of Classical Differential Geometry, a Qualitative Theory, 27^{o} CBM, Publicações Matemáticas, IMPA, (2009) with Ronaldo Garcia.

Introduced, with Carlos Gutierrez, the concept of "principal configuration" of curvature lines on surfaces. See Structurally Stable Configurations of Lines of Principal Curvature", Astérisque, França, v. 98–99, p. 195–215, (1982). The ideas leading to his work in this subject—traced back to the classical work of G. Monge, C. Dupin and G. Darboux—are discussed in his essay Monge's Ellipsoid. This research has been elaborared and extended in several directions by Sotomayor and his collaborators to include a large class of the differential equations of classical geometry (for example, the asymptotic lines, the axial curvature lines, the lines of mean curvature) and other classes of manifolds (for example, algebraic surfaces in 3 and 4 four dimensional Euclidean spaces).

== Death ==
He died on 7 January 2022, at the age of 79.

== Selected publications ==
- Sotomayor, J. (1993). "O elipsóide de Monge" (PDF). Revista Matemática Universitária. 15: 33–47.
- Sotomayor, J. (2007). "El elipsoide de Monge y las líneas de curvatura". Materials Matemàtics. 01: 1–25.
- Sotomayor, J.; Garcia, R. (2016). "Historical Comments on Monge's Ellipsoid and the Confgurations of Lines of Curvature on Surfaces". Antiquitates Mathematicae. 10: 348–354.
- Sotomayor, J. (2019). "A Private Mathematical Lesson, Rio de Janeiro,1933". Nexus Mathematicae. 02: 01–04.
- Sotomayor, J. (2020). "Reminiscences of a Mathematical Sojourn at San Marcos, 1959 - 61, and at IMPA, 1962". Nexus Mathematicae. 03: 01–14. doi:10.5216/nm.v3.63724. S2CID 238106577.
- Sotomayor, J. (2020). "On an encounter of two men of mathematics in Lima". Revista Brasileira de História da Matemática. 20 (40): 01–07. doi:10.47976/RBHM2020v20n4001-07. S2CID 229001686.
- Sotomayor, J. (2020). "On Maurício M. Peixoto and the arrival of Structural Stability to Rio de Janeiro, 1955". An. Acad. Bras. Ciênc. 92 (1): 01–07. arXiv:1910.02013. doi:10.1590/0001-3765202020191219. PMID 32267292. S2CID 215406476.
- Sotomayor, J.; Garcia, R.; Mello, L. (2020). "Maurício M. Peixoto (1921-2019)". Revista Matemática Universitária da SBM. 1: 01–22. doi:10.21711/26755254/rmu202013. S2CID 226539649.
- Sotomayor, J. (1992). "A Caderneta de Geometria". Revista do Professor de Matemática da SBM. 21: 1–5.
- Sotomayor, J. (2018). "Mathematical encounters". ICCM Notices. 06 (2): 94–98. arXiv:1803.10593. doi:10.4310/ICCM.2018.v6.n2.a11. S2CID 119591081.
- Sotomayor, J. (1974). "Generic one-parameter families of vector fields on two-dimensional manifolds". Publications Mathématiques de l'IHÉS. 43: 5–46. doi:10.1007/bf02684365. S2CID 123134043.
- Dumortier, F.; Roussarie, R.; Sotomayor, J. (1987). "Generic 3-parameter families of vector fields on the plane, unfolding a singularity with nilpotent linear part. The cusp case of codimension 3". Ergodic Theory and Dynamical Systems. 7 (3): 375–413. doi:10.1017/s0143385700004119.
- "with C. Gutiérrez: Structurally Stable Configurations of Lines of Principal Curvature", Astérisque, França, v. 98--99, p. 195--215, (1982).
- Sotomayor, J. (2021). "An encounter of classical differential geometry with dynamical systems in the realm of structural stability of principal curvature configurations". São Paulo Journal of Mathematical Sciences. 16: 256–279. arXiv:2009.05638. doi:10.1007/s40863-021-00231-6. S2CID 236365729.
