= NKR (disambiguation) =

NKR may refer to:

- Nagorno-Karabakh Republic, another name for the Republic of Artsakh, a former breakaway state in the Nagorno-Karabakh region
- Nandamuri Kalyan Ram, Telugu film actor, known by his initials, NKR
- National Kidney Registry, a US national registry for kidney transplanting
- Norwegian krone
- Nukuoro language
