= Kidney paired donation =

Kidney paired donation (KPD), or paired exchange, is an approach to living donor kidney transplantation where patients with incompatible donors swap kidneys to receive a compatible kidney. KPD is used in situations where a potential donor is incompatible. Because better donor HLA and age matching are correlated with lower lifetime mortality and longer lasting kidney transplants, many compatible pairs are also participating in swaps to find better matched kidneys. In the United States, the National Kidney Registry organizes the majority of U.S. KPD transplants, including the largest swaps. The first large swap was a 60 participant chain in 2012 that appeared on the front page of the New York Times and the second, even larger swap, included 70 participants and was completed in 2014. Other KPD programs in the U.S. include the UNOS program, which was launched in 2010 and completed its 100th KPD transplant in 2014, and the Alliance for Paired Donation.

According to a 2019 study, kidney exchanges improve overall transplant quality, which leads to fewer transplant failures. The exchanges also reduce waiting times for patients needing kidney transplants. The study found that the health care cost savings of kidney exchanges are substantial.

== Types of swaps ==
Swaps of kidneys come in two distinct types: cycles and chains. Cycles only include donors who are paired with a patient so that the donor donates a kidney only if their patient receives a kidney in the swap. Chains are initiated by non-directed donors. These donors, also known as unpaired or altruistic donors, donate a kidney without any expectation of a reciprocal kidney donation to any specific patient.

== Reasons ==
More than one-third of potential living kidney donors who want to donate their kidney to a friend or family member cannot donate due to blood type or antibody incompatibility. Historically, these donors would be turned away and the patient would lose the opportunity to receive a life-saving transplant. KPD overcomes donor–recipient incompatibility by swapping kidneys between multiple donor–recipient pairs. KPD is also being used to find better donor–recipient matches for compatible pairs who want a lower lifetime mortality and longer lasting transplant.

== History ==
Year	Event
1986	KPD first suggested by Rapaport
1991	First KPD program started in South Korea by Dr. Park
1999	First European KPD transplants performed in Switzerland
2000	First KPD transplants performed in U.S. at the Rhode Island Hospital
2001	Hopkins completes KPD transplants and begins first KPD program in U.S.
2004	Dutch established first national KPD program
2007	NEAD chain started by APD utilizing first bridge donor
2007	Charlie Norwood Living Organ Donation Act clarifies legality of KPD in U.S.
2008	National Kidney Registry organizes its first transplants on Valentine's Day
2009	Hopkins leads first 16 patient multicenter Domino Chain
2010	UNOS organizes its first KPD transplants
2012	National Kidney Registry completes largest chain involving 60 participants
2014	National Kidney Registry sets new record with 70 participant chain
2017	First Academic Paper published on “Chronological Incompatibility” outlining the ADP Voucher Program”

== Early days ==
The first paper outlining the concept of paired exchange was authored by FT Rapaport and published in 1986. The first recorded paired exchange transplants were organized in South Korea by Dr. Park beginning in 1991. For nearly a decade, only Park and his team in South Korea utilized this novel approach to facilitate transplants for incompatible donor–recipient pairs. In 1999, the first KPD transplants were performed in Europe followed by the first KPD transplants in the United States in 2000. Over the next ten years the United States would become the most competitive KPD market in the world with more than a dozen KPD programs commencing operations and many KPD programs failing. Outside of the United States, most of the KPD programs have been organized or sponsored by governments which has limited innovation in these programs. Three of the important early KPD programs in the U.S. were the Hopkins program led by Dr. Montgomery and Dr. Segev, the New England Paired Kidney Exchange (NEPKE) led by Dr. Delmonico and Professor Alvin Roth and the Ohio Organ Consortium which later reorganized as two competing programs, the Paired Donation Network (PDN) led by Dr. Woodle and the Alliance for Paired Exchange (APD) led by Dr. Rees.

The Hopkins program, which was based out of the Johns Hopkins Hospital, led the industry in early innovations including the critical "domino chain" breakthrough which allowed Good Samaritan donors to start chains, dramatically increasing the number of pairs that could be matched in a swap compared to the loop approach that was used previously. Once the Hopkins team began organizing Domino Chains, these swaps became larger and began attracting national media attention due to the massive complexity and significant impact of these large swaps. Unlike the Hopkins program that was hospital based, NEPKE was launched within the New England Organ Procurement Organization which served several states in the North East. The PDN and APD organizations were founded by transplant surgeons but attempted to create networks of transplant centers that would work together to pool their incompatible pairs, much like NEPKE but without OPO support.

In 2006, the APD conceived of a critically important innovation called "NEAD Chains" that amplified the matching power of Domino Chains by allowing Bridge Donors to extend chains. Prior to the utilization of Bridge Donors, a chain of transplant surgeries would be completed in one day, which limited the number of transplants that could be performed. A bridge Donor is someone whose paired recipient has received a kidney but does not donate for some period of time (generally 1 week to 3 months). Just like Domino Chains increased KPD transplants, the utilization of bridge donors also dramatically increased KPD transplants because chains could now be organized over several months and avoid the logistical limitations of performing all surgeries on one day. In 2007, the APD completed the first NEAD chain. That same year, the U.S. Congress passed the Charlie Norwood Act which clarified that paired exchange was legal. Prior to the passage of this law, many in the U.S. transplant community feared that KPD was unlawful due to the prohibition of "valuable consideration" as articulated in the NOTA laws that govern the U.S. transplant industry. With the passage of the Charlie Norwood Act, many more KPD programs were launched in the U.S. including the UNOS KPD program which was government sponsored with funding from deceased donor registration fees and charitable contributions.

== Break out phase ==
In 2007, Garet and Jan Hil founded the National Kidney Registry (NKR) after their daughter (age 10) lost her kidney function and needed a transplant. Both parents were incompatible and could not donate to their daughter, who later, after an extensive donor search, received a living donor kidney from her compatible cousin. Mr. Hil was the first non-physician to start/lead a KPD program and the first KPD leader to donate one of his kidneys, starting a chain that facilitated eight transplants. In 2008, the National Kidney Registry completed its first KPD transplants and implemented the next major innovation, the shipment of kidneys on commercial airlines. This breakthrough in logistics further expanded KPD. The first living donor kidney that was shipped on a commercial airline went from New York to Los Angeles and started NKR's second chain, which facilitated eight transplants using several bridge donors. Initially, NKR provided donors with the option of traveling to the matched recipient's hospital or donating locally and having their kidney shipped. Recipients could also choose if they would accept a shipped kidney or require the donor to travel to their center to donate. Over a two-year period, these preferences shifted until nearly all recipients would accept shipped kidneys with very few donors willing to travel. By 2010, the option to have a donor travel was phased out and all kidneys that needed to be moved between centers were shipped. After several near misses and with the UNOS reporting that 1–2% of deceased donor kidney lost or mis-routed, the NKR developed the first GPS tracking systems for human organs to monitor the location of all NKR kidney shipments. The utilization of GPS tracking devices is now mandatory for all NKR shipped kidneys.

In 2009, several more key innovations were yielding results at a single center KPD program, the Methodist Transplant Institute, in San Antonio led by Dr. Adam Bingaman. Prior to Dr. Bingaman's work, KPD was built on the notion that the results of a cross match test to determine donor–recipient compatibility are generally predictable and to ensure the prediction is accurate, a cross match test must be completed prior to the swap. In 5–10% of the cases, these cross match tests result in an unexpected positive cross match (bad) which causes a swap to fail. These swap failures are costly in terms of wasted time and testing but they are also demoralizing for the patients and donors involved in the cancelled swap. The Methodist program implemented the first donor blood cryo-preservation allowing the rapid cross matching of pairs in a swap without requiring fresh blood from donors. This approach accelerates the matching process, reduces swap failure rates and provides the ability to speculatively cross match potential donors for highly sensitized patients, leading to shorter wait times and more transplants for highly sensitized patients. Although the merits of using cryo-preserved donor blood for cross matching were clear, it proved difficult for multi-center KPD programs to implement cryo-preservation due to the complexity of the multi-center environment. The only U.S. multi-center KPD program that successfully implemented cryo-preservation was the National Kidney Registry but only after establishing a central lab and investing three years in software development. The second important innovation implemented in San Antonio was the re-engineering of the donor/patient intake process to educate and enroll compatible pairs in KPD so that the compatible recipient can get a better matched donor kidney. The development of cryo-preservation based cross matching and the systematic enrollment of compatible pairs has helped make San Antonio one of the leading KPD centers in the U.S.

By 2010, the UNOS KPD program had completed its first swap, while the NEPKE and PDN programs folded due to funding issues and increased regulatory requirements imposed on U.S. KPD programs by CMS and UNOS. During this time, the NKR developed the first donor preselect system that allowed donors to be accepted or declined before a match was offered. This innovation was taken from the brokerage industry, essentially porting the limit order concept to KPD. The preselect concept eliminated the need to use supercomputers for match runs because the number of valid one-ways was dramatically reduced. The donor preselect concept developed by the NKR was quickly copied by other major KPD programs and changed the nature of the mathematics needed to support KPD by dramatically reducing the number of one-way match possibilities.

In 2012, the National Kidney registry organized the largest swap in history which included 60 surgeries, completed over five months. That same year the NKR initiated the Advanced Donation Program (ADP) which inverted the role of the bridge donor – now donors were donating in advance of their paired recipient transplants which further alleviated scheduling challenges for paired donors. In 2014, the National Kidney Registry set a new record by organizing a swap that included 70 surgeries completing over two months. That same year, the NKR completed its first long term Advanced Donation whereby a donor donated on behalf of his grandson who may develop kidney failure 10–20 years in the future. Mr. Hil, the founder of the NKR, was the second donor to donate his kidney through this program. In 2015, the National Kidney Registry completed 360 KPD transplants which accounted for 62% of all U.S. KPD transplants and more than the combined volume of all other KPD programs in world.

== Outcomes ==
Concerns regarding the negative impact that Cold Ischemic Time (CIT) may have on graft survival, due to the shipment of the kidneys, initially caused concern in the transplant industry and slowed the adoption of KPD. This concern regarding CIT originated from deceased donor transplant experiences where greater CIT is correlated with lower graft survival rates. Prior to KPD, there was no reason to ship living donor kidneys and therefore, there was no understanding of the impact of CIT on outcomes. This concern proved to be unfounded as more living donor kidneys were shipped and the research demonstrated that CIT had no negative impact on KPD outcomes.

After completing over 1,000 KPD transplants, it was discovered that NKR's graft survival rates were actually better than the graft survival rates of the typical U.S. non-KPD living donor transplants. Researchers are working to better understand why NKR KPD transplants have superior outcomes and believe it may be driven by better HLA and donor age matching and/or better avoidance of recipient antibodies. Researchers have determined that the improved outcomes from NKR are not driven by a center effect although most of the top U.S. transplant centers participate in KPD via NKR. The improved outcomes from KPD transplants are opening the door for more compatible pair participation in KPD, allowing patient with compatible living donor to essentially trade-up and get a better matched kidney. The increasing enrollment of compatible pairs in KPD is shortening the wait times for incompatible pairs with hard to match blood type combinations (e.g. "O" patients with "A" donors) and driving more matches for highly sensitized patients (e.g. cPRAs > 90%).

Researchers have also discovered that better HLA matching not only leads to longer lasting transplants, but is also correlated with lower patient mortality rates because better matched kidneys require less immunosuppression and less immunosuppression reduces nephrotoxicity and other negative side effects from post-transplant anti-rejection medications. Equally important, better HLA matching reduces the number of antibodies that a transplant recipient will create making it easier to get a second, third or fourth transplant. This issue is critical for young transplant recipients who have a life expectancy that is longer than the expected graft survival (i.e. how long a transplanted kidney lasts). Deceased donor kidneys typically last 5–15 years and living donor kidneys typically last 10–30 years.

== Compatible pairs ==
When KPD first started, the focus was only on enrolling incompatible donor–recipient pairs. As paired exchange grew and the process became faster and more reliable, patients with compatible donors that wanted a better match, began enrolling in KPD. Researchers have identified that a better matched kidney is correlated with better outcomes. Specifically a better matched kidney lasts longer and may allow for a lower dosage of post-transplant immunosuppressive medications. Also a better matched kidney transplant is correlated with a lower lifetime mortality rate.

For compatible pairs, a more compatible match may improve outcomes and may help other patients with incompatible donors find a match and get transplanted. A blood type compatible pair (i.e. O donor with non-O recipient) can facilitate at least one and as many as six additional transplants. Compatible pair participation is the fastest-growing segment of KPD and may facilitate more compatible matches for patients with compatible donors and potentially reducing KPD wait times to less than 12 months for patients that have a cPRA ("Calculated panel reactive antibodies") less than 98%.

== Advanced Donation ==
Advanced Donation, which began in 2012 and expanded in 2014 to include Voucher donations and swap saver cases, expanded so rapidly that by 2017, Advanced Donation accounted for nearly half of the chain starts in the United States. As adoption of Advanced Donation increased, due to the timing advantages that made donation surgery more convenient for the donor, the size and complexity of KPD swaps were reduced, with the logical extension of this trend being the eventual elimination of traditional chain and loop swaps, replaced by 1-deep chains.

== See also ==
- Optimal kidney exchange - an optimization problem faced by kidney exchange programs, aiming to arrange the exchanges in a way that maximizes the number of transplants or some other objective.
