= Marilda Sotomayor =

Brazilian mathematician and economist

- Born: March 13, 1944 (age 82); Brazil
- Spouse: Jorge Sotomayor Tello

Academic background
- Education: Catholic University of Rio de Janeiro (PhD); Instituto Nacional de Matemática Pura e Aplicada (MD); Federal University of Rio de Janeiro (BS)

Academic work
- Discipline: Mathematics; Market design
- Institutions: University of São Paulo
- Website: www.marildasotomayor.com; Information at IDEAS / RePEc

Marilda A. Oliveira Sotomayor (born March 13, 1944) is a Brazilian mathematician and economist known for her research on auction theory and stable matchings. She is a member of the Brazilian Academy of Sciences, Brazilian Society of Econometrics, and Brazilian Society of Mathematics. She was elected fellow of the Econometric Society in 2003 and international honorary member of the American Academy of Arts and Sciences in 2020. She was elected fellow of the International Core Academy of Sciences and Humanities in 2023.

== Education ==
Sotomayor grew up in Rio de Janeiro, Brazil. She began her education at Federal University of Rio de Janeiro where she received her degree in Mathematics in 1967. Sotomayor continued her education at Institute of Pure and Applied Mathematics where she received her master's degree in Mathematics in 1972. She received her Ph.D. in Mathematics from Catholic University of Rio de Janeiro in 1981.

== Areas of interest ==
Marilda Sotomayor specializes in game theory, matching markets, and market design. She is the only expert in both game theory and matching markets in Brazil.

== Personal ==
Sotomayor married Jorge Sotomayor and had two children, a son and a daughter.

== Selected works ==
- Roth, A.E.; Sotomayor, M.A.O. (1992). Two-Sided Matching: A Study in Game-Theoretic Modeling and Analysis. Econometric Society Monographs. Cambridge University Press. ISBN 978-0-521-43788-2.
