= Horace Mann (disambiguation) =

Horace Mann (1796–1859) was an American education reformer.

Horace Mann may also refer to:

- Sir Horace Mann, 1st Baronet (1706–1786), diplomat, longstanding British resident in Florence, known for his correspondence with Horace Walpole
- Sir Horatio Mann, 2nd Baronet (1744–1814), member of Parliament and cricket patron, nephew of Sir Horace Mann, 1st Baronet
- Horace Mann Jr. (1844–1868), American botanist
- Horace Kinder Mann (1859–1928), British papal historian
- Horace Mann Towner (1855–1937), American politician
- Horace Mann Bond (1904–1972), American historian and father of civil-rights leader Julian Bond

== See also ==
- Horace Mann Historic District, Gary, Indiana, United States
- Horace Mann, Indiana, one of the former neighborhoods forming Ambridge Mann neighborhood, Indiana, United States
- Horace Mann School (disambiguation)
- Horace Mann Educators Corporation
