= J. Keith Murnighan =

John Keith Murnighan (November 23, 1948 – June 3, 2016) was an American social scientist and author. He was the Harold H. Hines Jr. Distinguished Professor of Risk Management at the Kellogg School of Management, Northwestern University, where he taught from 1996 to 2016. His areas of expertise included: leadership, negotiations, ethics, individual and group decision-making, group dynamics, teams, psychology, auctions, diversity, and trust.

Murnighan earned his Ph.D. (1974) and MS degrees (1972) in social psychology and a BS in psychology (1970) from Purdue University. Prior to joining Kellogg, he taught at the University of Illinois and the University of British Columbia. He also earned an MFA in photography from the University of Illinois.

He was the father to five children: Jack Murnighan (born 1969), Erik Murnighan (born 1972), Kate Keegan-Cook (born 1987), Annie Murnighan (born 1995) and William Murnighan (born 1999). His first marriage to Marilyn Becker ended in divorce. He married Elizabeth Keegan in 1991 in Urbana, Illinois.

Murnighan's research has been published in many different academic journals, primarily in organizational behavior, psychology, and economics. He has published seven books, most recently Do Nothing! How to Stop Overmanaging and Become a Great Leader, released in June 2012 by Portfolio/Penguin.

== Selected publications ==
=== Books ===
- 1991. The Dynamics of Bargaining Games (Prentice Hall)
- 1992. Bargaining Games: A New Approach to Strategic Thinking in Negotiations (William Morrow)
- 1993. Social Psychology in Organizations: Advances in Theory and Research (Prentice Hall)
- 2002. The Art of High-Stakes Decision-Making: Tough Calls in a Speed-Driven World (with John Mowen; John Wiley & Sons)
- 2006. Social Psychology and Economics (with David De Cremer and Marcel Zeelenberg: Lawrence Erlbaum)
- 2010. Social Psychology and Organizations (with David De Cremer and Rolf van Dick: Psychology Press).
- 2012. Do Nothing! How to Stop Overmanaging and Become a Great Leader (Portfolio/Penguin)
