= Ido Erev =

Israeli-American behavioral economist

- Born: December 6, 1959 (age 66); Afula, Israel

Academic background
- Education: University of North Carolina

Academic work
- Discipline: Behavioral Economics; Incentives
- Institutions: Technion

Ido Erev (Hebrew: עדו ערב) is an Israeli psychologist.

Ido Erev is the Women’s Division—ATS Academic Chair, Vice Dean for the MBA programs, and heads the Technion section of the Max Wertheimer Minerva Center for Cognitive Research. He leads the Technion's ICORE group for Empirical Legal Studies of Decision Making.

In early 2020, prior to the virus reaching global pandemic status, his research was used in an article in the New York Times to explain the rapid spread of the COVID-19 coronavirus.

His research has also been written about in the Jerusalem Post and the Times of Israel.

== Career ==
Prof. Erev was the Michael A. Gould fellow at Columbia Business School; a Marvin Bower Fellow at Harvard Business School; a fellow at the Israel Institute for Advanced Studies; a visiting professor at Erasmus School of Economics; and a research environment professor at Warwick Business School

== Research ==
Erev publishes primarily on reinforcement learning in individual decision tasks as well as 2-player games. He has contributed the learning chapter to the Handbook of Experimental Economics
