= National Kidney Registry =

Registry of kidney doners and recipients

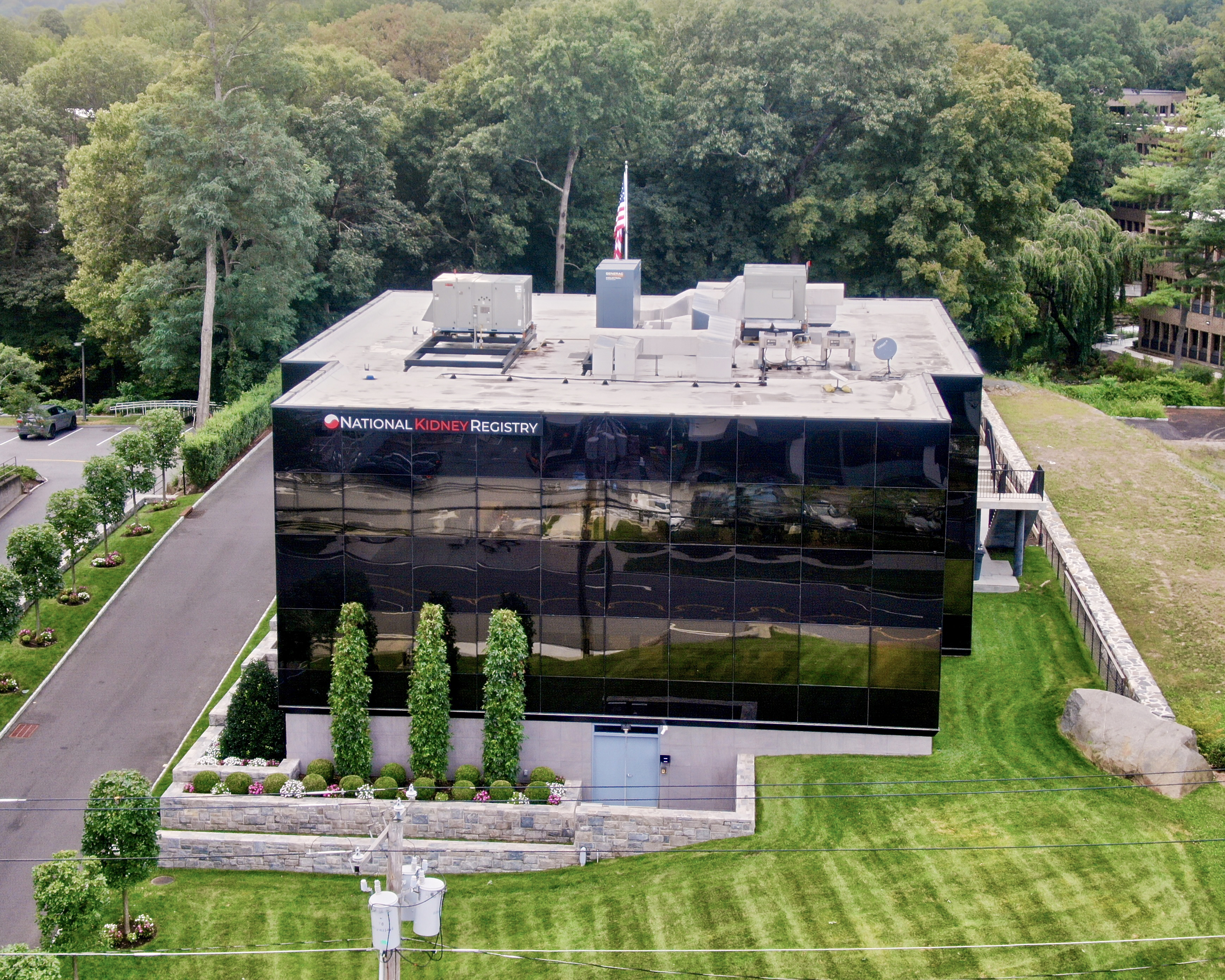
- Headquarters in Greenwich, Connecticut
- Type: For-profit
- Industry: Software and Logistics
- Founded: July 12, 2007; 19 years ago
- Headquarters: Greenwich, Connecticut, U.S.
- Area served: U.S.
- Website: kidneyregistry.com

The National Kidney Registry (NKR) is a national registry in the United States listing living kidney donors and recipients in need of a kidney transplant. NKR facilitates hundreds of "Kidney Paired Donation" (KPD) or "Paired Exchange" transplants annually.

More than one-third of potential living kidney donors who want to donate their kidney to a friend or family member cannot because of blood type or antibody incompatibility. Historically, these donors would be turned away and the patient would lose the opportunity to receive a life-saving kidney transplant. KPD overcomes donor-recipient incompatibility by swapping kidneys between multiple donor-recipient pairs, and connecting them in longer chains, as well as taking an altruistic non-directed donor, and starting chains of kidney transplants.

What the NKR does is consolidate the incompatible pairs of donors and recipients from transplant centers all over the United States, into a single registry, and facilitate the transplant process.

== History ==
The NKR was founded in 2007 by the Hil family, after their youngest daughter lost her kidney function at age ten. Both parents were ruled out from donating to their daughter because they were biologically incompatible. After many unsuccessful attempts to find a compatible donor through all of the kidney paired exchange programs in the United States, a compatible donor was found. After this transplant ordeal, the Hil family founded the National Kidney Registry to eliminate the problem of incompatible donors, by building a national kidney paired donation (KPD) program.

The NKR organized its first swap on Valentine's Day in 2008 at Cornell Medical Center in New York City. This first swap was a 3-deep chain that ended with a bridge donor who donated two months later, extending the chain to 5-deep.

The NKR's second swap started with the shipment of a kidney from Cornell to UCLA School of Medicine. This was the first time a living donor kidney was shipped on a commercial airplane. This second chain crossed the country three times, facilitating eight total transplants at UCLA, Cornell, Stanford University School of Medicine, and California Pacific Medical Center.

Based on these early experiences, many safeguards were implemented to reduce the risk of broken chains, which dropped the frequency of broken chains from 33% in 2008 to 2% in 2015.

In 2012, the NKR broke the world record for the largest kidney swap by organizing a 30-deep chain involving 60 donors and recipients. This chain was started by Rick Ruzzamenti, a 44-year-old from Riverside, California. The swap took four months to complete and involved 17 different transplant centers across 11 states. Three years later, on March 26, the next record breaking chain was set into motion by Kathy Hart, a 48-year-old attorney from Minneapolis. This swap took two months to complete and involved 26 different transplant centers.

The NKR has facilitated 10,752 kidney transplants, as of June 24th, 2025. The NKR has grown its network of transplant centers to 102 centers across 35 states and the District of Columbia.

== Key Innovations ==
The rapid growth of KPD transplants in the United States has been driven by the following key NKR innovations.

- Shipped Kidneys - The NKR was the first KPD program to utilize commercial airlines to ship kidneys. This allows kidney donors to undergo surgery near their home, eliminating the need to travel to a distant city to donate. This innovation has evolved to include the use of air charter jets and turboprop aircraft, on board couriers for connecting flights, charter flights combined with direct commercial moves, red-eye flights from West to East, and helicopter transport for shorter distances.
- HLA coding standardization - In the startup period, the NKR experienced virtual cross match failure rates in excess of 50% because HLA coding schemes were not sufficiently standardized in the United States. The NKR implemented a standardized HLA coding scheme and forced the identification of more antigen and antibody data such as DP, Bw, Cw, DQ and DQA. This refinement and expansion of HLA data increased the virtual cross match accuracy from less than 50% to greater than 95% allowing more patients to get transplanted in a shorter period of time.
- Finance & contracting - In late 2009, a 3-deep cluster being organized by the NKR fell apart the day before the swap was scheduled to commence because the hospitals in the swap could not agree on how to pay each other for the donor surgeries. Not only did this swap fall apart, but the last minute cancellation was the catalyst for a broken chain as the bridge donor for this cluster eventually withdrew. In response to this and prior financial challenges, the NKR assembled a team of finance experts from member centers and developed a financial model that would eliminate these challenges. Once the financial model was agreed upon by all member centers, the NKR created a universal "center to center agreement" that would allow any member center to ship a kidney to, or accept a kidney from, another member center.
- GPS tracking - In 2010, the NKR implemented the first GPS tracking systems used for shipping organs in the United States. After several near misses including a case where a kidney was off-loaded from an "overweight" midnight red-eye flight out of LAX (Los Angeles International Airport), the NKR made GPS tracking mandatory for all kidney shipments. In this case, the kidney sat in the baggage storage area for approximately two hours before it was discovered by an airline employee. An emergency private jet was ordered and later departed Los Angeles at 4:00 AM. The kidney arrived in Philadelphia on time and was successfully transplanted. By 2015, the NKR was the largest user of GPS tracking systems in the United States for organ shipments.
- Repairing real-time swap failures - A real-time swap failure occurs when a swap falls apart after one or more donor surgeries have begun, leaving a patient, whose donor has already donated, without a kidney. Real-time swap failures can occur when a donor surgery must be aborted due to previously undetected donor medical conditions and when a recipient reacts badly to the surgery after the surgery has started. The NKR's historical statistics indicate that a real time-swap failure occurs once every 200 - 300 transplants. Out of the seven real-time swap failures that the NKR experienced by the end of 2015, all patients that were initially left without a kidney when the swap failed received a kidney within 1 – 6 months. Chain end donors and non-directed donors are the only way to recover from a real-time swap failure. The NKR has been able to quickly repair swap failures because of the large number of chains it starts each year, including 83 chains in 2015.
- Exploratory cross matching - Exploratory cross matching for KPD was pioneered by Dr. Adam Bingaman at the Methodist Specialty & Transplant Hospital to test for HLA compatibility in advance of initiating a swap. In 2013, the NKR adopted this approach in a multi-center environment to test donor, patient compatibility before a match is offered. Although NKR's adoption of exploratory cross matching helped a few highly sensitized patients get transplanted and reduced the rate of swap failures due to unacceptable cross match results, it was not until the implementation of donor blood cryopreservation in 2015 that exploratory cross matching yielded substantial results.
- Voucher Program - The Voucher Program (formerly known as "Advanced Donation Program") is a paired exchange separated in time. This program allows living donors to donate their kidney before their Intended Recipient receives a kidney. Some voucher donors have donated only a few weeks before their Intended Recipients received a kidney. Some voucher donors are donating 10–20 years before their intended recipient expects to need a transplant, and some voucher donors are donating in the hope that their intended recipient will never need a transplant. Garet Hil, Founder of the NKR, donated his kidney through the program in 2015 which initiated a swap that facilitated eight transplants. Most long term voucher cases involve older donors who want to donate on behalf of their intended recipient before they become too old to donate.
- Donor Shield - In 2017, the NKR was the first KPD organization to provide donor protections to donors participating in paired exchange, including lost wage reimbursement, travel and lodging for donors and dependents, legal support, donor complication coverage, donor kidney transplant prioritization, automated screening and history and 5 star follow up surveys.
- Remote Donation - In 2017, the NKR launched the Remote Donation Network (RDN). The RDN allows someone who wants to donate a kidney to a friend or family member in a distant city without requiring the donor to travel to the transplant center in the distant city. Remote donation utilizes proven logistics systems pioneered in kidney swaps by the National Kidney Registry over the past decade to safely transport the kidney from the donor's local hospital to the transplant center in the distant city. Research has proven that shipping a live kidney for transplant has no significant impact on patient outcomes.

== Media Coverage ==
The NKR's innovations have generated significant media coverage including a front-page story in the New York Times. and nationally televised interviews by Katie Couric with the CBS Evening News. Diane Sawyer from ABC News, and Byron Pitts at Nightline.
