= Horace Mann Historic District =

Historic district in Indiana, United States

- U.S. National Register of Historic Places
- U.S. Historic district
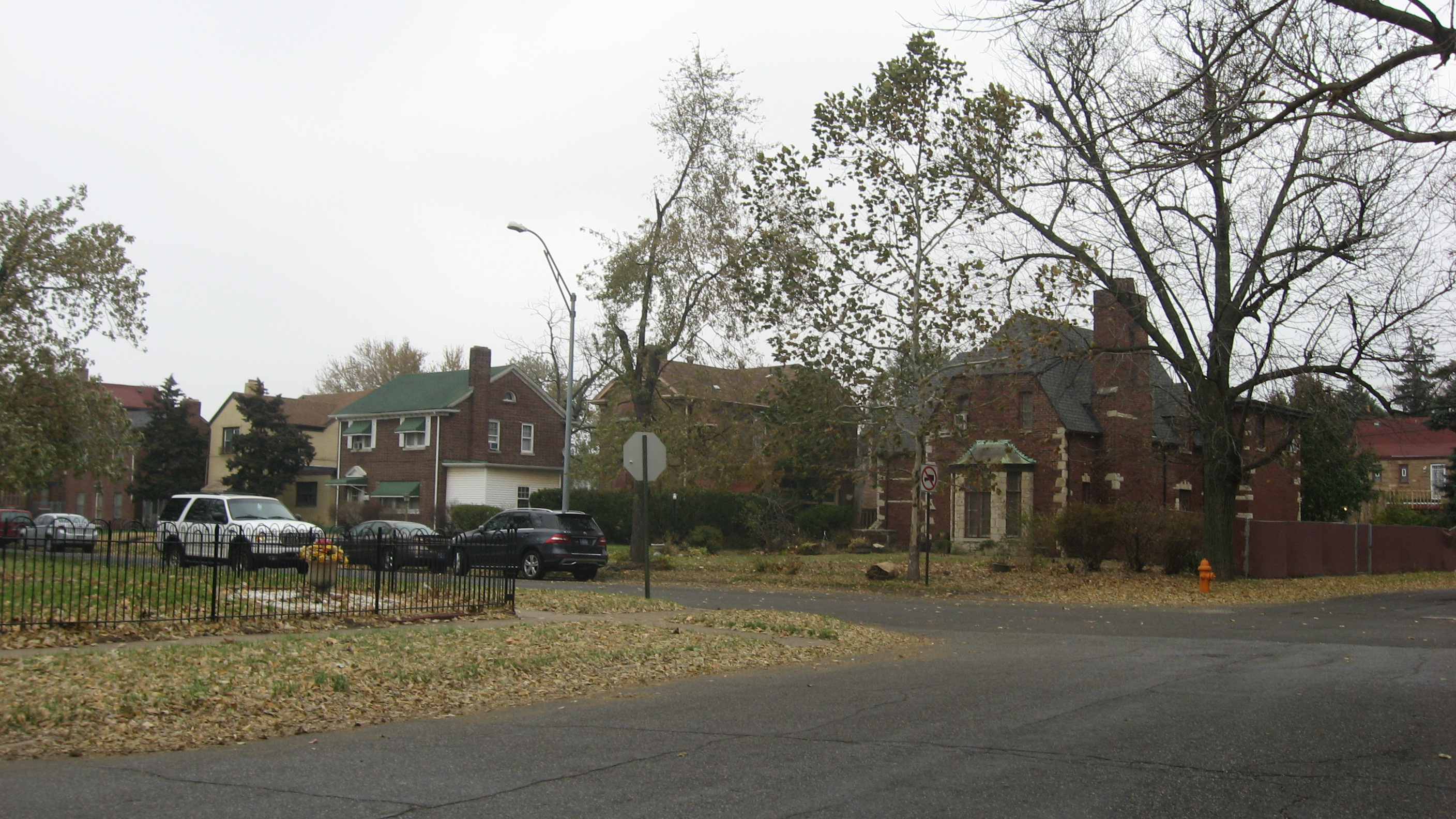
- McKinley and Sixth, November 2013

- Location within Indiana Location within the United States
- Location: Roughly bounded by W. 5th, 8th, and 7th Aves., and Cleveland and Roosevelt Sts., Gary, Indiana
- Coordinates: 41°36′00″N 87°21′47″W
- Area: 26 acres (11 ha)
- Built: 1919
- Architect: Hess, Louis C.; Warriner, L. Harry; Cohen, Isadore M.; Rissman and Hirschfeld; Leone, Amedeo; Dise, Joseph Ivan
- Architectural style: Colonial Revival, Tudor Revival, Renaissance Revival, Mission Revival, Bungalow/Craftsman
- MPS: Historic Residential Suburbs in the United States, 1830-1960 MPS
- NRHP reference No.: 13000722
- Added to NRHP: September 18, 2013

Horace Mann Historic District is a national historic district located at Gary, Indiana, United States. The district encompasses 130 contributing buildings and 1 contributing site in an exclusively residential section of Gary. They were largely built between 1919 and 1961, and include examples of Colonial Revival, Tudor Revival, Renaissance Revival, Spanish Colonial Revival, and Bungalow / American Craftsman style architecture.

It was listed in the National Register of Historic Places in 2013.
