= José Tola Pasquel =

Peruvian engineer

José Tola Pasquel (February 12, 1914 – December 1, 1999) was a Peruvian engineer.
