= Charter Schools in Massachusetts =

Charter schools operate with considerably more independence than traditional public schools. However, Massachusetts has two kinds of charter schools - Commonwealth Charters and Horace Mann Charters. Horace Mann charter schools differ from Commonwealth charter schools as they must be located within a school district, and are usually converted from public schools.

"In Massachusetts, [...], tuition payments are determined largely by average per-pupil expenditure in sending districts. Not surprisingly, therefore, public school districts are concerned about the revenue lost when their students enroll in charter schools."

There are 78 charter schools operating in the Commonwealth of Massachusetts during the 2021–2022 academic year. Individual school profiles are available at the Massachusetts Department of Elementary and Secondary Education. In the 2015–2016 school year, 40,200 students were enrolled in Massachusetts charter schools representing 4.2% of the total public school enrollment, with another 32,600 students on the initial waitlist for 2016–2017.

== Charter school accountability ==
"The state Charter School Office reviews and makes recommendations on charter applications, reviews the performance of existing charter schools, and decides whether charters should be renewed. Charter schools are held accountable via annual reports, financial audits, and site visits, and are required to file for renewal every five years. Renewal applications must show that a school's academic program is successful, that the school is a viable organization, and that it has been faithful to its charter. Since 1994, the state has received a total of 350 charter applications and has granted 76. [Nine] of the 76 Massachusetts charters ever granted were surrendered or revoked [as of 2009]".

=== Approval process ===
"The Massachusetts charter school law states that any person, group, or entity may apply for a public school charter, with the exception of for-profit companies and private schools. In applying for a charter, the school's founders must submit an application detailing why the school should be granted a charter. The application details must include the school's vision, educational philosophy, curriculum, assessment plans, structure, governance, management, facilities, transportation, and student population, including its plans for serving special student groups. The final application is followed by intensive reviews from a state panel and the local school district, as well as public hearings and interviews with the applicants and the school's proposed board of trustees. After gathering feedback and documentation from all parties, the Commissioner of Education makes recommendations to the Board of Education, which makes the final decision."

The process for gaining charter approval in Massachusetts is nationally recognized as being extremely rigorous. The Center for Education Reform's annual report on the strength of charter school laws ranks Massachusetts sixth out of 41. In 2003, the Thomas B. Fordham Institute published a comprehensive study on the quality of states’ charter authorization processes, in which Massachusetts' authorization process was ranked first in the nation: "Massachusetts has in place comprehensive application review and oversight processes. For new schools, it now involves an approval cycle that lasts nearly two years from initial application to school opening."

=== Academic performance ===
"Charter public schools must follow the same state educational standards, administer the same state tests, and abide by the same laws and regulations as other public schools in the Commonwealth. A charter school application itself serves as the first stage of public accountability, as it is used to determine if the school has been faithful to the charter, particularly with respect to its core mission, academic programs, financial integrity, and record of student achievement. The record on the accountability of Massachusetts charter public schools is strong (and stronger than that of district schools). Like all public schools in the Commonwealth, charter public schools must administer the Massachusetts Comprehensive Assessment System (MCAS) tests. Most charter public schools supplement MCAS test performance data with results from other nationally recognized standardized tests, such as the SAT 10, ITBS, or TerraNova. Results from all assessments are used in the charter school accountability process and are central in evaluating whether a school is an academic success."

"In 2005, a higher percentage of students in charter public schools scored proficient or advanced on all 10 MCAS tests compared with their districts—9.2 percent, 8.7 percent, and 8.3 percent higher in English, math, and science, respectively."

- "In Boston, 15 percent, 12 percent, and 12 percent more students achieved proficiency in English, math, and science, respectively, in charter schools than in district schools.
- In Worcester, 16 percent, 8.5 percent, and 7.5 percent more students achieved proficiency in English, math, and science, respectively, in charter schools than in district schools.
- In Springfield, 19 percent, 26 percent, and 6 percent more students achieved proficiency in English, math, and science, respectively, in charter schools than in district schools."

2010 MCAS results for all Massachusetts schools and districts is available at the Massachusetts Department of Elementary and Secondary Education.

It's important to note thought that because of the lottery system, charter schools do not get any transient students, have more dedicated parents, more stable home lives, and have much lower percentages of disadvantaged students. For example:

- Greenfield MA, 45.6% economically disadvantaged (poor) students while their local charter School (Four Rivers Charter School) has 25.8%
- Hilltown Charter has 6.6% disadvantaged while the town it is in (Easthampton) has 22%.

=== Evaluation ===
Charter schools must submit an Accountability Plan that establishes “specific five-year performance objectives to measure the school’s progress and success in raising student achievement, establishing a viable organization, and fulfilling the terms of its charter.” No such plan is currently required of traditional district schools unless they are ‘underperforming.’

The Department of Education conducts also annual site visits for every charter school. "In addition, after the conclusion of each academic year, a charter school must submit a publicly released Annual Report to the Department of Education that documents the school's most recent activities. This document specifically reports the school's performance record in accordance with the objectives and methods of measuring achievement found in its Accountability Plan. Both of these documents, the Accountability Plan and the Annual Report, are unique to charter public schools and are not required of traditional public schools in the state."

The following are the rules for charter schools in the Commonwealth of Massachusetts:

- Charter schools may not discriminate on the basis of race, color, national origin, creed, sex, ethnicity, sexual orientation, mental or physical disability, age, ancestry, athletic performance, special need, or proficiency in the English language or a foreign language, or academic achievement.
- Charter schools must provide special education services, English language instruction, and other special services to meet the needs of their students.
- Charter schools may not charge an application fee, or charge tuition or fees for required educational programs.
- Charter schools may not give an entrance exam, or otherwise test applicants for aptitude or knowledge before admission.
- Charter schools must give preference to students who live in their districts.
- Charter schools can decide which grade levels they want to include.
- Students who enroll in charter schools can withdraw at any time and attend local district schools in their city or town.

=== Revoking charters ===
When charter schools do not perform to expectations, they are closed. Charter school closures are believed to be the evidence of accountability in action. As of February 2009, only six Massachusetts charters had ever been closed (Boston University Residential Charter School, Frederick Douglass Charter School, Lynn Community Charter School, North Star Academy Charter School, Roxbury Charter High School and YouthBuild) - half of those were closed for academic deficiencies.

=== Teacher retention ===
Teachers in Massachusetts charter schools tend to be significantly younger than teachers in either traditional or pilot schools in the Commonwealth. Sixty-eight percent of faculty members in charter schools are under the age of 32 while less than half of the faculty in traditional and pilot schools fall in this age bracket. Meanwhile, less than 10% of staff in charter schools are over the age of 49, compared to 41% and 24% of staff in traditional and pilot schools, respectively.

However, a 2009 study of charter school staffing by Stuit and Smith examined how teacher turnover differed between charter and traditional schools. The study found that charter schools had a teacher turnover rate of 25% while the rate at traditional public schools was 14%.

== Charter school finance ==
A basic premise of charter school reform in public education is offering more autonomy in the use of funds and the design of curriculum in exchange for greater accountability in academic and financial outcomes. This premise poses a significant policy challenge for state policymakers to establish an appropriate level of regulation; charter schools must be sufficiently independent yet still conform to most state and federal education and financial management laws. In crafting legislation, state policymakers strive to strike a balance between creating an overly prescriptive charter law and failing to sufficiently safeguard public investments. Management and oversight of public funds is a serious responsibility. Exercising this responsibility includes monitoring the appropriate use of funds and implementing consequences for financial mismanagement that range from interventions to school closure.

=== Foundations and grants ===
Charter schools often will operate a school foundation (501c-3) as well as a general fund. The foundation is set up to fund extra operating expenses of the school beyond the state funding. The foundations generally rely on donations from a variety of sources. If the foundation owns the school building and has positive operating funds, the state cannot claim ownership in the case of revocation of a school's charter-if a foundation is not in place, the building and all assets can be taken over by the state.

The following law is MA charter law, 603 CMR 1.00:

(8) Upon the revocation, non-renewal, or voluntary return of a Commonwealth charter, title to all of the property of the charter school shall immediately vest in the Commonwealth, subject to the rights of any secured party holding a perfected security interest in the property of such charter school. Any funds remaining after the satisfaction of the charter school's obligations shall be deposited in the General Fund. 603 CMR 1.13(8) shall not apply to the extent the charter school or any other interested party demonstrates that charter school property was purchased solely by, or solely with funds paid to the school by, persons or entities other than the Commonwealth, in which case ownership of the property shall be transferred to such persons or entities, unless otherwise voted by the board of trustees.

(9) Upon the revocation, non-renewal, or voluntary return of a Horace Mann charter, title to all of the property of the charter school shall immediately vest in the school district in which the school is located, subject to the rights of any secured party holding a perfected security interest in the property of such charter school. 603 CMR 1.13(9) shall not apply to the extent the charter school or any other interested party demonstrates that charter school property was purchased solely by, or solely with funds paid to the school by, persons or entities other than the district or Commonwealth, in which case ownership of the property shall be transferred to such persons or entities, unless otherwise voted by the board of trustees.

== Admission lottery ==
"Each charter school collects applications and holds its own lottery in years the school is over-subscribed. Siblings of students already attending the school are guaranteed a seat, as are students continuing on from earlier grades. Students can apply to as many charter schools as they like; the lotteries are statistically and administratively independent. Students may therefore be accepted or wait-listed at more than one school. When admitted students decline, slots open up for additional offers farther down the lottery list. Thus, some students may be offered spots immediately, while others may be offered seats closer to the beginning of the school year. Charter school lottery records were matched to MCAS and SIMS data using applicants' names and year and grade of application."
