= Jung v. Association of American Medical Colleges =

US anti-trust lawsuit

Jung v. Association of American Medical Colleges was an antitrust class-action lawsuit that alleged collusion to prevent American trainee doctors from negotiating for better working conditions. The working conditions of medical residents often involved 80- to 100-hour workweeks. The suit had some early success but failed when the US Congress enacted a statute exempting matching programs from federal antitrust laws.

== Background ==
Every year, American medical students and graduates participate along with foreign-trained physicians in a national matching plan to obtain a position in an accredited resident training program. Applicants and programs that participate in the matching plan submit rank-ordered preferences for training. A mathematical algorithm is used to place an applicant in a preferred program that also prefers the applicant.

The National Resident Matching Program, also referred to as "The Match," is the only comprehensive national matching plan in the United States.

== Lawsuit ==
The suit was launched by Paul Jung, MD on behalf of all current and former medical residents against defendants that oversaw and participated in the matching process as well as institutions that employed medical residents.

The three physicians who launched the suit alleged that the NRMP Matching program was an anti-competitive practice, claiming that:

- fourth-year medical students were required to apply to the Match, and had no opportunity to negotiate their terms of employment with teaching hospitals (if they did not apply, they could not enter a residency accredited by the ACGME, and hence could not become certified as physicians by an ABMS-recognized board, meaning that they cannot practice their specialty)
- the defendants limited the number of residency positions available in U.S. teaching hospitals
- the defendants placed "substantial obstacles to the ability of a resident to transfer employment from one employer to another during the period of a residency"
- the ACGME encouraged or required participation in the Match as a condition of accreditation for institutions offering residencies.
- the defendants shared information on conditions of employment, and reviewed them in order to keep salaries low.

The defendants challenged the admissibility of the lawsuit with several arguments, including a lack of jurisdiction and that the plaintiffs had not been injured. The court dismissed the cases against two defendants for lack of jurisdiction, and three because the claims of conspiracy did not involve them. The federal district court did allow the case to proceed against 17 defendants, ruling:

... the Court finds that plaintiffs adequately have alleged a common agreement to displace competition in the recruitment, hiring, employment and compensation of resident physicians and to impose a scheme of restraints that has the purpose and effect of fixing, artificially depressing, standardizing and stabilizing resident physician compensation and other terms of employment among certain defendants.

== Legislative change ==
The lawsuit ended when Congress enacted legislation as a rider added to an unrelated bill (the Pension Funding Equity Act) that exempted participation in a matching program from federal antitrust laws.

The rider was called "Confirmation of antitrust status of graduate medical resident matching programs" (Section 207). Neither the rider nor the then-ongoing Jung v. AAMC case was debated. The rider was lobbied for by the AAMC and the American Hospital Association, and sponsored by Senator Judd Gregg of New Hampshire and Senator Edward Kennedy of Massachusetts. Senators Kohl, Feingold, and Bingaman publicly criticized the way in which the rider was added.

The rider praised the 50-year-old Matching Program, saying that "[a]ntitrust lawsuits challenging the matching process, regardless of their merit or lack thereof, have the potential to undermine this highly efficient, pro-competitive, and long standing process" and "would divert the scarce resources of our country's teaching hospitals and medical schools from their crucial missions of patient care, physician training, and medical research"

The bill containing the rider was signed into law by President George W. Bush on April 8, 2004.

The new law prohibited "using allegations related to the Match to support any antitrust claim", retroactively. The court ruled that the plaintiff's case was dependent on allegations related to the Match. The case was dismissed under the authority of the new law.

== See also ==
- Medical resident work hours
- National Resident Matching Program
- Match Day (medicine)
- Medical education
