= Salvage rider =

Provision in the Emergency Supplemental Appropriations Act of 1995

The 1995 salvage rider was a provision in the Emergency Supplemental Appropriations Act of 1995 (P.L. 104-19, Sec. 2001, July 27, 1995) to expand salvage timber sales from July 27, 1995, through December 31, 1996, by exempting them from public challenges under environmental laws. This was controversial because it reinstated numerous timber salvage sales in Washington and Oregon that had been stopped to protect endangered and threatened species habitat.

== See also ==
- Healthy Forests Initiative
- Rider (legislation)
