= Salvage logging =

Removing trees from damaged forest areas

Salvage logging is the practice of logging trees in forest areas that have been damaged by wildfire, flood, severe wind, disease, insect infestation, or other natural disturbance in order to recover economic value that would otherwise be lost.

Although the primary motivation of salvage logging is economic, it has also been suggested that salvage logging may reduce erosion, reduce intensity of future wildfires, and slow buildup of pest insects. However, there is little evidence to support such claims, and most evidence supports the view that salvage logging is harmful to forest health and function.

As with other logging operations, the harvesting may be either by selection, thinning or clearcutting, and a regeneration plan may be put in place after the logging. Salvage logging may include removal of remaining live trees in predominantly dead stands.

== Examples ==
One highly publicized instance of salvage logging followed the Biscuit Fire in Oregon and California in 2002. After the fire, the United States Forest Service salvaged timber burned by the fire. The process was expedited when President George W. Bush signed the Healthy Forests Restoration Act allowing salvage logging to occur more quickly and with reduced threat of lawsuits. President Bill Clinton signed an earlier piece of legislation promoting salvage logging (commonly referred to as the Salvage Rider) as part of the Omnibus Rescissions Bill on July 27, 1995.

Forests across western North America impacted by mountain pine beetle infestations were salvage logged. Salvage logging after windthrow is also common.

== Ecological impacts ==
Salvage logging is of particular concern ecologically because disturbed landscapes tend to be under appreciated and undervalued, and therefore more imperiled than other successional stages on the landscape. Concerns include simplification of forest structure, degradation and destruction of wildlife habitat, little or no impact to future fire risk, changes in nutrient cycling, and increased erosion.

As a part of adaptive management strategies designed to meet objectives in long term forestry planning, e.g. the Northwest Forest Plan, among other actions, salvage logging operations generally take the large snags and surviving trees, leaving lower density stands dominated by small-diameter snags. Bird species diversity can be negatively impacted by this structural change because cavity nesters preferentially nest in larger trees. There is also strong evidence that salvage logging consistently affects insect diversity.

Proponents argue that, among other benefits, salvage logging reduces the harmful effects of future fires in the logged area and is a prelude to managed reforestation protocols. Opponents maintain that the costs and benefits of salvage logging have not been scientifically studied, and that there is some evidence that under some circumstances, the practice may increase damage from future fires and reduce natural regeneration due to soil disturbance and the addition of logging slash.

Salvage logged sites have increased erosion and reduced forest productivity.

== Controversy ==
In the United States, salvage logging is a controversial issue for two main reasons. Legal provisions for salvage logging can be used to justify cutting down damaged trees in areas that are otherwise protected from logging.

Salvage logging may also encourage arson, either after a failed lumber sale or to gain permission to log in protected areas, such as old growth forest or regions set aside for the protection of endangered species.

== See also ==
- Salvage sales
- Salvage rider
- Sanitation harvest or cutting or logging is to remove trees for protection against a pest or potential pest.
