= Medical resident work hours =

Medical residency shifts done by interns

Medical resident work hours refers to the (often lengthy) shifts worked by medical interns and residents during their medical residency.

As per the rules of the Accreditation Council for Graduate Medical Education in the United States of America, residents are allowed to work a maximum of 80 hours a week averaged over a 4-week period. Residents work 40–80 hours a week depending on specialty and rotation within the specialty, with residents occasionally logging 136 (out of 168) hours in a week. Some studies show that about 40% of this work is not direct patient care, but ancillary care, such as paperwork. Trainee doctors are often not paid on an hourly basis, but on a fixed salary; in some locations, they are paid for booked overtime. Limits on working hours have led to misreporting, where the resident works more hours than they record.

Medical resident work hours have become a hot topic of discussion due to the potential negative results of sleep deprivation on both residents and their patients. According to a study of 4,510 obstetric-gynecologic residents, 71.3% reported sleeping less than 3 hours while on night call.

In a survey of 3,604 first- and second-year residents, 20% reported sleeping an average of 5 hours or less per night, and 66% averaged 6 hours or less per night.

In a recent landmark study published in May 2021, the World Health Organization and the International Labour Organization estimated that globally in 2016, more than 745,000 persons died as a result of having a heart disease event or a stroke attributable to having worked long hours (here defined as 55 or more hours per week), making exposure to long working hours the occupational risk factor with the largest disease burden.

== Causes of high workloads ==
Medical residencies usually require lengthy hours of trainees. Trainees are traditionally required to be present for set shifts, with the ending time of the shift dependent on momentary circumstances. The flexibility of this system makes it easy to abuse.

Junior doctors often lack bargaining power and have difficulty changing employers. This leaves them with little say over their working conditions. Critics of long residency hours note that resident physicians in the US have no alternatives to the position that they are matched to, meaning residents must accept all conditions of employment, including very long work hours, and that they must also, in many cases, contend with poor supervision. This process, they contend, reduces the competitive pressures on hospitals, resulting in low salaries and long, unsafe work hours. The National Resident Matching Program has also been accused of deliberately limiting the available residency posts, thus decreasing the demand for residents, despite work for many more residents being available.

In emergencies and in chronically understaffed health systems, all staff, including junior doctors, may be overworked. In some cases, excess work may be disproportionately assigned to junior doctors.

There are financial incentives for overworking junior doctors. Since the least-experienced staff are usually paid less, it is cheaper to assign paid overtime to them. Deliberate understaffing and paid or unpaid overtime for junior doctors is thus used to reduce costs for medical facilities, although this may also reduce quality of care, which can be expensive.

The medical culture has also been blamed. "Generation-bashing", where senior doctors look down on junior doctors who work fewer residency hours than they did, can push junior doctors to overwork. A desire for formal recognition, such as promotion, may also be important. A higher "entry barrier", with work conditions poor enough to burn out some residents, may be actively desired.

There is also a belief that long hours do, or can, improve training. The ability to follow a patient from admission through the next 30 or 40 hours may be valued more than observing several patients for shorter periods.

The desire to continue caring for a patient frequently leads doctors to work for longer than is permitted.

== Effects on health ==
=== Effects of sleep deprivation on residents ===
The evidence for harm to people who are deprived of sleep, or work irregular hours, is robust.

Research from Europe and the United States on nonstandard work hours and sleep deprivation found that late-hour workers are subject to higher risks of gastrointestinal disorders, cardiovascular disease, breast cancer, miscarriage, preterm birth, and low birth weight of their newborns. It has also been shown that slow-wave sleep assists in clearing out toxins that build up during the day. Consequently, the disruption of slow-wave sleep increases the level of amyloid-beta, a protein aggregate commonly found in Alzheimer's, present in cerebrospinal fluid the following morning. Chronic sleep deprivation and the resulting fatigue and stress can affect job productivity and the incidence of workplace accidents. There are also social effects. Married fathers in the United States who work fixed night shifts are 6 times more likely than their counterparts who work days to face divorce; for married mothers, fixed nights increase the odds by a factor of 3.

=== Effects of resident sleep deprivation on patients ===
The public and the medical education establishment recognize that long hours can be counter-productive, since sleep deprivation increases rates of medical errors and affects attention and working memory. Chronically sleep-deprived people also tend to strongly underestimate their degree of impairment. A study found that after 24 hours of sustained wakefulness, hand-eye coordination decreased to a level equal to the performance observed at a blood alcohol concentration of roughly 0.10%. In a meta-analysis of 959 physicians, staying awake for a continuous 24 to 30 hours decreased physicians' overall performance by nearly 1 standard deviation and clinical performance by more than 1.5 standard deviations.

Competence is affected by the number of work hours, number of continuous work hours, regularity of sleep, and frequency and speed of handovers to the next shift. "Night float" seems to have particularly bad effects, due to the circadian misalignment cause by abrupt switches between day and night shifts, but is the most commonly used method of adapting to duty hour restrictions.

Many studies have found performance impairment in medical residents due to sleep deprivation. The average sleep time was less for the same emergency department residents working night shifts than when working day shifts, and they took longer to intubate a mannequin and made more errors in a triage simulation when working on the night shift than the day shift. First year medical residents given an EKG arrhythmia-detection task performed significantly worse while sleep-deprived than when well-rested. Medical residents were also found to take more time and make more errors on laparoscopic procedures after one night on call.

A 2004 landmark study found reducing sleep deprivation substantially reduced errors in intensive care units. The study redesigned first-year junior doctors' schedules to minimize the effects of sleep deprivation, circadian disruption, and handover problems, assigning four shifts where there had been three and allowing an hour's overlap for handovers at the ends of shifts. Each junior doctor was closely observed under both schedules. Errors were recorded (and corrected); they were then rated for severity by other doctors blinded to which treatment the errors had occurred under. Doctors and observers inevitably knew that they were part of a study.

In 2015 two controlled studies of the effect of the ACGME-mandated maximum shift began, involving nearly 190 hospitals and residency training programs. The studies randomly assigned medical residents to shifts longer than specified by the ACGME regulations. A study led by the University of Pennsylvania, which will end in 2019, assigned residents in 32 medical training programs to shifts as long as 30 hours. It used 31 other programs as a control group. Despite the longer shifts, the other overall rules were still adhered to. The other study, led by Northwestern University and ending in 2015, was similar in design. Both were conducted with the approval of the ACGME. In neither study were residents and patients necessarily told they were part of a human subjects experiment and informed consent was not required, which caused some controversy.

== Duty hour restrictions ==
=== Effects of duty hour restrictions ===
Regulatory duty hour restrictions, in theory, should reduce the number of duty hours worked. In practice, they may not because the restrictions are not always followed. Studies to evaluate the effects of duty hour restrictions on patient outcomes have been somewhat mixed.

Many of the studies rely on self-reported hours, self-reported errors, and self-reported sleep deprivation, with large opportunities for bias. More objective measures, such as tracking, perceptual tests, and blood hormone levels, are generally not used. Measurements of patient deaths and harm are often used as response variables. Many of the studies that have been done on this topic are specialty specific and so cannot be generalized to all medical residency programs.

=== Observations on the ACGME restrictions in US ===
The 2003 working-hour restrictions imposed in the US by the ACGME allowed many studies comparing patient outcomes before and after the reforms. They generally show little effect. This corresponds to the impressions of medical staff.

One 2014 systematic review of 135 studies spanning 1980 to 2013 showed no overall improvement in patient safety but still indicated that duty hour restrictions have increased morbidity in some cases.

Another systematic review of 27 studies conducted in 2015 found similar results, and a 2007 study of over 8 million hospital admissions of Medicare beneficiaries that compared mortality rate before and after implementation of the ACGME standards showed no difference in mortality.

=== 2003 reform ===
One study of 318,636 patients done in a Veterans Administration setting showed that work hour restrictions reduced mortality substantially for a similar set of diagnoses.

Another study found that the 2003 ACGME reform restrictions were associated with a small reduction in the relative risk for death in 1,268,738 non-surgical patients drawn from a national survey of hospitals.

=== 2011 reform ===
When surveyed about duty hour restrictions, both medical and surgical residents, as well as residency faculty perceive that patient safety hasn't changed or has suffered as a result. Additionally, many residents note an increase in self-reported errors.

=== Problems with duty hour restrictions ===
It is largely felt that actual duty hours (opposed to reported duty hours) have not changed substantially: prior to the implementation of work hour regulations, residents were already working an average of 82 hours per week. Many studies rely on self-reported hours, but significant bias to under-report duty hours exists for a few important reasons: One is that statutes do not provide whistleblower protections to residents who report work hour violations. Second, the penalty for work hour violation is loss of accreditation, which would adversely affect medical residents and prevent them from becoming board certified. Finally, some residents may be pressured by their residency programs to underreport hours or even punished if they do not.

Moreover, these studies – particularly the ones that find favorable results - may fail to account for confounders that positively impact outcomes, including the wide adoption of electronic medical records, a shift toward team-based care, and implementation of best practices.

Duty hour regulations may not address the root causes of medical errors, and may inadvertently create new problems that impact patient outcomes. In order to adhere to duty-hour standards, residents must handoff their patients to other residents more frequently, which can lead to miscommunication, interrupted continuity of care and increased errors. Also, most studies show that residents see more patients now, despite having less time, leading to more administrative work and less time for direct patient care and education. One systematic review found that resident learning has been unfavorably impacted by duty hour regulations, and because medical education affects knowledge and competence, this may result in poor decision-making and medical errors.

== Proposed methods of reducing workloads ==
The most commonly proposed method is regulation of working hours, but this is ineffective if regulations are ignored. Whistle-blower protection laws, protecting residents who report violations of working-hour regulations from losing their residencies and thus their route to professional accreditation, have been proposed.

Increasing the bargaining power of residents has been proposed, on the argument that they would then choose the best training programs. The 2002 Jung v. Association of American Medical Colleges anti-trust case sought more freedom for medical residents to negotiate working conditions. In order to obtain accreditation as doctors, American medical residents are required to enter into a contract to accept whatever residency position they are assigned; they are then matched to a job by the AAMC and told what the working conditions and pay are. The plaintiffs allege that this is an anti-competitive practice, and that the defendants artificially limit the number of resident positions available. The suit had some early success, but failed when the U.S. Congress enacted the Pension Funding Equity Act in 2004, which exempted matching programs from federal antitrust laws.

Where there is a shortage of doctors, proposed solutions include reducing the costs of medical training and more extensive training for nurses, who then take over duties formerly done by doctors. Greater access to medical school for more doctors would increase the pool of available doctors and is another proposed method of reducing workloads. Improving the working conditions of doctors might also increase recruitment and decrease burnout leading to fewer doctors leaving medicine.

=== Regulations ===
==== EU regulation ====
Junior doctors in the European Union fall under the European Working Time Directive, which specifies:

- 48 working hours per week (down from 56 under the old UK regulations), calculated over a period of 26 weeks.
- 11 hours continuous rest per day
- one day off each week, or two days off each fortnight
- 20 minutes of continuous rest every 6 hours

However, junior doctors may choose to work more than 48 hours a week, or opt out of the EWTD entirely by signing a waiver with the employer. They may not be punished for not working more than the directed hours. Many trainees nonetheless feel obliged to work longer hours. The rest times are mandatory, but may be taken at another time if it cannot be taken as scheduled.

==== American regulation ====
The issue is politically controversial in the United States, where federal regulations did not limit the number of hours that can be assigned during a graduate medical student's medical residency. Starting in 2003, with revisions in 2011, regulations from the Accreditation Council for Graduate Medical Education capped the work-week at 80 hours. As of 2018, shifts are capped (with limited exceptions) at a maximum of 24 consecutive hours of direct patient care with an additional 4 hours for transition of care (sign out, completing notes, etc.) for first, second, and third year residents.

The Accreditation Council for Graduate Medical Education (ACGME) has limited the number of work-hours to 80 hours weekly, overnight call frequency to no more than one in three, 30-hour maximum straight shifts, and at least 10 hours off between shifts. While these limits are voluntary, adherence has been mandated for accreditation.

The Institute of Medicine (IOM) built upon the recommendations of the ACGME in the December 2008 report Resident Duty Hours: Enhancing Sleep, Supervision and Safety. While keeping the ACGME's recommendations of an 80-hour work week averaged over 4 weeks, the IOM report recommends that duty hours should not exceed 16 hours per shift for interns (PGY 1). The IOM also recommended strategic napping between the hours of 10pm and 8am for shifts lasting up to 30 hours. The ACGME officially recommended strategic napping between the hours of 10pm and 8am on 30-hour shifts for residents who are post graduate year 2 and above but did not make this a requirement for program compliance. The report also suggests residents be given variable off-duty periods between shifts, based on the timing and duration of the shift, to allow residents to catch up on sleep each day and make up for chronic sleep deprivation on days off.

Though the ACGME regulations were intended to increase medical resident sleep hours and improve patient safety, they had also created unintended negative consequences in the education of new residents and the workplace learning culture. In 2017, the ACGME changed its regulations once again, citing a trial conducted from July 2014 to June 2015 in 117 general surgery residency programs. In the Flexibility in Duty Hour Requirements for Surgical Trainees (FIRST) trial, programs were randomly assigned to a group following current ACGME duty-hour restrictions or a group with more flexible policies that waived rules on maximum shift lengths and time off between shifts. When looking at primary outcomes of 30-day rate of postoperative death or serious complications, less-restrictive duty-hour policies were not associated with an increased rate of death or serious complications. Starting July 1, 2017, the ACGME raised the maximum number of consecutive hours a first year resident can work from 16 hours to 24 hours.

Despite the sleep deprivation medical residents constantly experience due to long working hours, a minority of residents still wish to not have work hour regulations at all. In the survey of 4510 obstetric-gynecologic residents, about one in five opposed any limits on their work hours. These residents cited "additional experience" as the most common reason (69.0%), followed by "opportunity to see rare cases" (46.5%) and "continuity with patients" (31.8%).

===== Towards an 80-hour work week =====
The Libby Zion case, in which an 18-year-old college student died of a drug interaction after being treated by a fatigued intern and resident in a New York hospital, led to the establishment of the Bell Commission in 1987 to address physician training hours. Although the serotonin syndrome was not widely known at the time (neither by the house staff nor the attending physician), the Bell Commission continued to address the house officer sleep deprivation issue. Its recommendations were adopted by the state of New York in 1989, and limited residents to no more than 24 consecutive hours in the hospital, and no more than 80 hours a week with an in-house supervising attending physician present at all times.

Though other federal regulatory and legislative attempts to limit medical resident work hours have materialized, none have attained passage.

Dr. Richard Corlin, president of the American Medical Association, has called for re-evaluation of the residency training process, declaring "We need to take a look again at the issue of why is the resident there."

The U.S. Occupational Safety and Health Administration (OSHA) rejected a petition seeking to restrict medical resident work hours, opting to rely on standards adopted by ACGME, a private trade association that represents and accredits residency programs. On July 1, 2003, the ACGME instituted duty hours requirements for all accredited residency programs, since revised in 2011.

The ACGME duty hour standards that went into effect in July 2003 require:

1. An 80-hour weekly limit, averaged over 4 weeks, inclusive of all in-house call activities;
2. A 10-hour rest period between duty periods and after in-house call;
3. A 24-hour limit on continuous duty, with up to 6 additional hours for continuity of care and education;
4. No new patients to be accepted after 24 hours of continuous duty;
5. One day in 7 free from patient care and educational obligations, averaged over 4 weeks, inclusive of call; and
6. In-house call no more than once every 3 nights, averaged over 4 weeks.

Following the ACGME's proposed regulation of duty hours the American Osteopathic Association (AOA) followed suit. Below are the requirements adopted by the American Osteopathic association.

1. The trainee shall not be assigned to work physically on duty in excess of 80 hours per week averaged over a 4-week period, inclusive of in-house night call.
2. The trainee shall not work in excess of 24 consecutive hours inclusive of morning and noon educational programs. Allowances for inpatient and outpatient continuity, transfer of care, educational debriefing and formal didactic activities may occur, but may not exceed 6 hours. Residents may not assume responsibility for a new patient after working 24 hours.
3. The trainee shall have on alternate weeks 48-hour periods off, or at least one 24-hour period off each week, averaged over a 4-week period.
4. Upon conclusion of a 24-hour duty shift, trainees shall have a minimum of 10 hours off before being required to be on duty again. Upon completing a lesser hour duty period, adequate time for rest and personal activity must be provided.
5. All off-duty time must be totally free from assignment to clinical or educational activity.
6. Rotations in which trainee is assigned to Emergency Department duty shall ensure that trainees work no longer than 12-hour shifts.
7. The trainee and training institution must always remember the patient care responsibility is not precluded by the work hour policy. In cases where a trainee is engaged in patient responsibility which cannot be interrupted, additional coverage should be provided as soon as possible to relieve the resident involved.
8. The trainee may not be assigned to call more often than every third night averaged over any consecutive four-week period.

Another related issue regarding the imposition of maximum hour policies for medical residents is the question of enforcement, where some enforcement proposals have included extending U.S. federal whistle-blower protection to medical residents in order to ensure compliance and afford medical residents certain employment protection.

There are still inherent problems with the current ACGME policy. Resident duty hour restrictions are difficult to assess and enforce. Also, it is unclear who is ultimately responsible for monitoring duty hour adherence (i.e. state licensing boards, residency programs, attendings, residents, etc.). Additionally, a one-size-fits all solution may not be ideal, since the need for certain duty hours may vary among specialties.

India

The work hours of medical residents in India remains highly unregulated. Indian researcher Dr Edmond Fernandes, Founder of CHD Group called for regulating work hours but the same has not been implemented by the Ministry of Health and Family Welfare till date.

== Coping mechanisms ==
Although strategic napping is recommended by the ACGME, no studies have assessed the effect of napping as a fatigue mitigation technique. Requiring naps during long shifts could be a small step toward reducing fatigue and potentially decreasing errors. Resident surveys suggest that a greater emphasis on education, decreased workload, and more ancillary support would better improve patient outcomes. Focusing on hospital best practices and physician incentives like pay-for-performance in residency could help with the implementation of some of these solutions.

Techniques to reduce circadian misalignment include avoiding abrupt changes in shift time, getting more sleep, which makes the sleep schedule more flexible, and the use of caffeine and ambient light of specific wavelengths.

== See also ==
- Libby Zion Law
- Stress (biology)
- Work–life balance
- Working Time Directive
