= Uchilishtna Gora Nature Reserve =

Nature reserve in Bulgaria

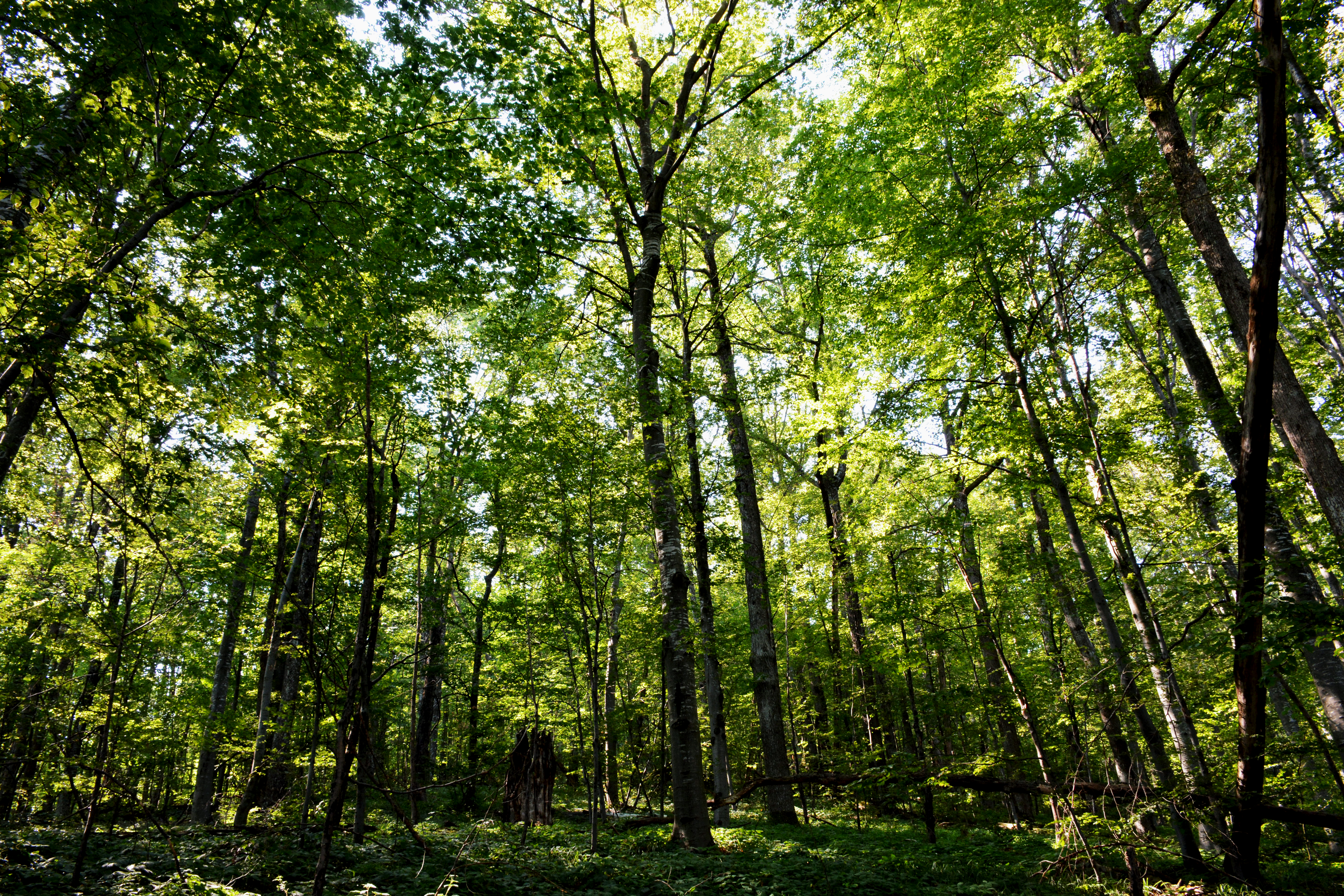
- Interactive map of Uchilishtna Gora Nature Reserve
- Coordinates: 42.9800°N 23.8359°E
- Area: 134.7 ha (333 acres)
- Created: 1963/1999

Uchilishtna Gora (Bulgarian: Училищна гора, literal translation: "School Forest") is a maintained nature reserve in the Balkan Mountains of Bulgaria, located in the territory of Bozhenitsa village, in Botevgrad Municipality, Sofia Province. The closest settlements are the villages of Bozhenitsa (2.3 km), Lipnitsa (4.3 km) and Skravena (5 km). The area of the maintained reserve is 134.7 hectares (333 acres).

Established in 1963, on 15 October 1999, the Bulgarian Ministry of Environment and Water categorized the "Uchilishtna Gora" Reserve into a maintained reserve aiming at the maintenance and protection of the oak forest with trees, some of which are higher than 30 metres and up to 200 years old. The State Forest Administration in Botevgrad has scheduled a list of activities aimed at the protection of the reserve:

1. Sanitation harvest in case of stand-of-trees drying by more than 5%;
2. Maintenance and regenerative actions;
3. Use of biological means for plant protection.

== Flora and Fauna ==
On the territory of the Uchilishtna Gora Reserve, 39 bryophyte species, 20 lichen species, 41 fungi species, 207 plant species and 73 herbal plants have been recorded. There are about 100 invertebrate species, 9 amphibian species, 12 reptile species, 62 nesting bird species, 19 mammal species and 20 bat species, inhabiting the reserve.

The only protected species, listed in Bulgaria's Red Data Book, is the Hermann's tortoise (Testudo hermanni).
