= Sanitization =

Sanitization is the disinfection and cleaning of an area or an item. Sanitizing uses heat or chemicals to reduce the number of microorganisms to safe levels. It can also refer to:

== Information ==
- Censorship, editing that prevents sending or publishing sensitive information or unapproved opinions
- Data sanitization, actions taken to prevent unscrupulous recovery of information that has been deleted from storage media
- Redaction, editing that removes or blocks out sensitive information from documents before disclosure, typically by government and military

== Other ==
- HTML sanitization, removing potentially harmful tags and attributes from web pages
- Sanitation harvest, or sanitation cutting, destroying and removing infected or infested trees to protect nearby trees from insects or diseases

== See also ==
- Sanitation, removal and disposal of human and liquid waste (sewage) and solid waste (garbage) to protect health and sources of drinking water
- Data cleansing, the process of identifying and correcting (or deleting) invalid, incorrect, or non-useful data
