= Public Access and Lands Improvement Act =

- Announced in: the 113th United States Congress
- Sponsored by: Rep. Jeff Miller (R, FL-1)
- Number of co-sponsors: 0

Codification
- Acts affected: Act of July 30, 1946

Legislative history
- Introduced in the House as H.R. 2954 by Rep. Jeff Miller (R, FL-1) on August 1, 2013; Committee consideration by United States House Committee on Natural Resources; Passed the House on February 6, 2014 (220-194)

The Public Access and Lands Improvement Act (H.R. 2954) is an omnibus bill that combines ten smaller, previously introduced bills all related to land and land use. Several of the bills transfer federal lands to state or local governments. The bill also addresses cattle grazing.

The bill passed in the United States House of Representatives during the 113th United States Congress.

== Background ==
Federal lands are lands in the United States for which ownership is claimed by the U.S. federal government.

As of March 2012, out of the 2.27 billion acres in the country, about 28% of the total is owned by individuals represented by the federal government according to the Interior Department.

== Congressional Budget Office report ==
This summary is based largely on the summary provided by the Congressional Budget Office, a public domain source.

Title I, Escambia County, Florida Formerly the original H.R. 2954

Title I would authorize Escambia County in Florida to convey certain property that it received from the federal government. The specified properties had been part of the Santa Rosa Island National Monument and were transferred to the county in 1947 for public purposes. As a condition of that conveyance, Escambia County can reconvey the properties to the federal government or to the State of Florida. Title I would remove that condition and add new conditions. First, any conveyance of the specified properties would require the county to convey to Santa Rosa County any of the property that falls within the jurisdictional boundaries of Santa Rosa County. Second, any proceeds above the direct or incidental costs from conveyances would be transferred to the federal government.

The Congressional Budget Office (CBO) estimates that implementing title I would have no significant impact on the federal budget. Based on information provided by the National Park Service (NPS) and local government entities, CBO estimates that the proceeds from any conveyances would be used to cover those costs.

Title II, Anchorage, Alaska Formerly H.R. 585

Title II would require the Secretary of the Interior to convey the reversionary interest of the United States in three acres of land to the city of Anchorage, Alaska. Under current law, the city holds title to those lands and will retain title as long as the lands are used for public purposes. If the city stops using the lands for such purposes, title would revert to the federal government.

Based on information provided by the city of Anchorage, CBO expects that, under current law, the city would continue to use the affected lands for public purposes and hold title to those lands over the next 10 years. Furthermore, under title II, any administrative costs associated with conveying the reversionary interest in those lands would be paid by the city; therefore, CBO estimates that implementing title II would have no effect on the federal budget.

Title III, Fernley, Nevada Formerly H.R. 1170

Title III would direct the Secretary of the Interior to sell up to 9,400 acres of federal land to the city of Fernley, Nevada. Based on information provided by the city, CBO estimates that enacting that provision would increase offsetting receipts, which are treated as reductions in direct spending, by $5 million over the 2014-2024 period.

Under title III, if the city offered to purchase any of the affected lands, the Secretary would be required to sell the lands for fair market value. CBO expects that the city would only offer to purchase the lands if a private developer provided the amounts necessary to complete those purchases. Based on information provided by the city, CBO expects that up to 25 percent of the affected lands would be purchased over the 2014-2024 period. We estimate that the average value of those lands would be about $3,500 per acre, based on the value of similar lands in the area.

Tile IV, Database of BLM Lands Formerly H.R. 2095

Title IV would prohibit Bureau of Land Management (BLM) from acquiring new lands until the agency develops a public database of all BLM lands that have been identified for disposal. Based on information provided by BLM, CBO expects that the agency would need less than a year to construct the database, and we expect that the agency would defer the purchase of some lands during that period. Because, under current law, BLM has the authority to spend receipts from the sale of federal lands in southern Nevada to purchase environmentally sensitive lands, CBO estimates that enacting title IV would reduce direct spending by about $7 million in 2015 and increase direct spending by that amount in 2016. Overall, we estimate that enacting title IV would have no net impact on direct spending.

Title V, Cape Hatteras National Seashore Formerly H.R. 819

Title V would require the Cape Hatteras National Seashore in North Carolina to be managed according to the Interim Protected Species Management Strategy/Environmental Assessment (Interim Strategy) issued by the National Park Service (NPS) on June 13, 2007, until the NPS issues a new final rule. Under the bill, that final rule could not include additional restrictions on pedestrian or motorized access to the seashore beyond those in the Interim Strategy unless the restrictions are based on peer-reviewed science and the public has had the opportunity to review and comment on them.

Title V also would prohibit implementation of the existing final rule entitled "Special Regulations, Areas of the National Park System, Cape Hatteras National Seashore—Off-Road Vehicle Management" and would invalidate the consent decree concerning use of off-road vehicles at the seashore, which was filed on April 30, 2008.

Based on information provided by the NPS, CBO estimates that implementing the legislation would cost about $2 million over the 2014-2019 period, assuming the availability of appropriated funds. Those costs would be incurred as management of the seashore transitioned to the Interim Strategy and the new final rule is developed.

CBO estimates that enacting title V also would affect direct spending. Under the existing final rule, the NPS charges fees (which are recorded in the budget as offsetting receipts) for off-road vehicle permits. Those fees are available to be spent without further appropriation.

Those fees are not a part of the Interim Strategy; therefore, under title V, the NPS would collect fewer fees. However, CBO estimates that the net impact on the budget of that change would not be significant.

Title VI, Green Mountain Lookout Formerly H.R. 908

Title VI would prevent the United States Forest Service from removing a building from the Glacier Peak Wilderness Area in Washington state unless the agency determines that the structure is unsafe for visitors. Based on information provided by the Forest Service, CBO estimates that implementing title VI would have no significant net impact on the federal budget.

In 2012, a federal court ordered the Forest Service to remove a lookout structure from Green Mountain, located in the wilderness area. Under title VI, the agency would be authorized to remove the structure only if it poses a risk to public safety. Because the lookout was recently reconstructed, CBO expects that, under title VI, the agency would allow the structure to remain on the mountain for several years. As a result, CBO estimates, the Forest Service would not need to spend about $200,000 in appropriated funds to remove the structure; the amounts required to maintain the structure over the next five years would be minimal.

Title VII, Yellowstone and Grand Teton National Parks Formerly H.R. 3492

Title VII would nullify within three years of enactment existing regulations prohibiting hand-propelled vessels on streams and rivers in the Yellowstone and Grand Teton National Parks in the states of Wyoming, Montana, and Idaho. Title VII also would direct the U.S. Fish and Wildlife Service to coordinate the use of hand-propelled vessels on the Gros Ventre River within the National Elk Refuge in Wyoming. Under existing regulations, the National Park Service prohibits boating on five of the 168 lakes in Yellowstone National Park and a 1,000-foot section of the Snake River in Grand Teton National Park. Based on information provided by the Department of the Interior, CBO estimates that implementing title VII would cost about $4 million over the 2014-2019 period, subject to the availability of appropriated funds to conduct resource studies, promulgate new rules, and manage boating in the newly opened areas.

Title VIII, Federal Grazing Lands Formerly H.R. 657

Title VIII would increase the term of new grazing permits on federal lands from 10 years to 20 years and allow expired and transferred grazing permits to remain in effect until new permits are issued by BLM or the Forest Service. Based on information provided by the affected agencies, CBO estimates that enacting that provision would have a minimal impact on offsetting receipts each year because those agencies have the authority under current law to extend expired permits. The bill would allow the affected agencies to collect offsetting receipts from transferred permits sooner than it would under current law.

Because title VIII would allow transferred permits to remain in effect under the terms of the original permit until that permit expires, CBO expects that the agencies would receive fewer requests for new permits in the next few years; however, because those permits would need to be renewed in later years, CBO estimates that implementing the provision would have no significant net effect on agencies' workloads over the 2014-2019 period.

Finally, title VIII would exclude certain grazing lands from compliance with the National Environmental Policy Act (NEPA) and would exempt certain renewed or transferred grazing permits from NEPA requirements. CBO estimates that those provisions would have no effect on discretionary spending because we expect that any funds not spent on NEPA activities on those lands would be spent to reduce the agencies' backlog of incomplete NEPA activities on other federal lands.

Title IX, Stanislaus National Forest Formerly H.R. 3188

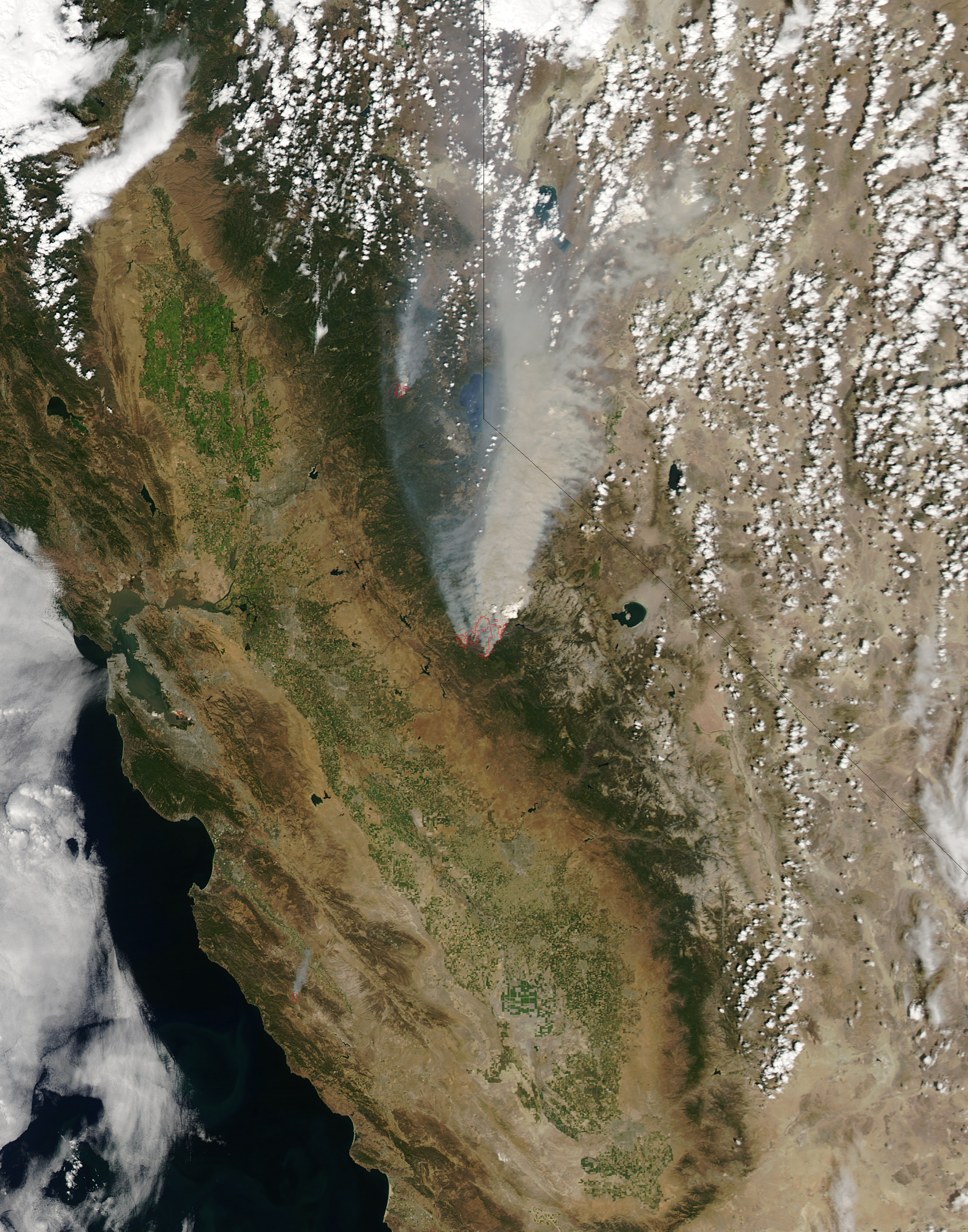
Satellite image of the Rim Fire, August 23, 2013 The sale of timber from damaged trees due to this fire would be affected by Title IX of this bill.

Title IX would direct the Secretaries of the Interior and Agriculture to conduct salvage sales of dead, damaged, or downed timber resulting from the 2013 Rim Fire in California. Sales of salvage timber under title IX would be exempted from certain laws related to the environment and forest management. In addition, sales conducted under title IX would not be subject to administrative or judicial review.

CBO estimates that implementing title IX would have no significant net impact on the federal budget. Under current law, we expect that the Forest Service will sell significant amounts of salvage timber from areas affected by the 2013 Rim Fire over the next several years. In addition, based on information provided by the Forest Service, CBO expects that other factors, including a lack of manufacturing capacity and hazardous weather conditions in the affected areas, will prevent the agency from significantly increasing the amount of salvage timber sold under the bill. Finally, CBO expects that any increase in the amount of salvage timber sold in the affected areas would be partially offset by reductions in the sale of such timber in other national forests.

Title X, Chesapeake Bay Formerly H.R. 739

Title X would require the Environmental Protection Agency (EPA) to develop, no later than one year after the bill's enactment, a management plan for the Chesapeake Bay Program and for restoration activities related to the bay. EPA would be required to update the management plan every two years. The legislation would require new financial reports on the Chesapeake Bay Program from the Office of Management and Budget and would require EPA to appoint an independent evaluator, who would review and report to the Congress on the plan. Based on information from EPA, CBO estimates that implementing this legislation would cost about $1 million annually over the 2015-2019 period, subject to the availability of appropriated funds.

== Procedural history ==
H.R. 2954 was introduced into the United States House of Representatives on August 1, 2013, under the long title "To authorize Escambia County, Florida, to convey certain property that was formerly part of Santa Rosa Island National Monument and that was conveyed to Escambia County subject to restrictions on use and reconveyance." The bill was introduced by Rep. Jeff Miller (R, FL-1). It was referred to the United States House Committee on Natural Resources and then to the United States House Natural Resources Subcommittee on Public Lands and Environmental Regulation. It was ordered reported by voice vote by the committee on October 30, 2013, and was reported alongside House Report 113-296 on December 16, 2013.

On February 4, 2014, the United States House Committee on Rules passed House Resolution 472. The resolution merged the original H.R. 2954 with nine other land use bills as one omnibus bill. The Rules Committee changed the name of H.R. 2954 to the Public Access and Lands Improvement Act. The bill passed the House on February 6, 2014, with a vote of 220–194.

== Debate and discussion ==
Overall, President Barack Obama's administration opposes most of the bill. However, Obama did not threaten to veto the bill.

The White House announced in a Statement of Administration Policy that it opposed Title VII of the bill, a portion that would allow paddle boats into additional areas of Yellowstone and Grand Teton National Parks. According to The Hill, the White House did not say why it opposed this, but "the White House is likely bothered by the idea of Congress using legislation to strike down two federal regulations."

Supporters of Title VII argued that changing the rules about paddle boats would be a good thing. Rep. Rob Bishop indicated that the rules had originally been intended to stop overfishing years ago. Rep. Cynthia Lummis (R-WY) argued that "recreational activities like paddling are a terrific, low-impact way to enjoy the outdoors."

== See also ==
- List of bills in the 113th United States Congress
