= Christmas tree bill =

Political term

In the United States Congress, a Christmas tree bill is a political term referring to a bill that attracts many, often unrelated, floor amendments. A Christmas tree bill consists of many riders. The amendments which adorn the bill may provide special benefits to various groups or interests, or provide pork barrel spending. The term refers to the proposed legislation being subject to having each member of Congress hang their own amendment on it.

== Definition ==
The traditional Christmas tree bill begins as a minor bill that passes the House. Senators are not limited by the germaneness rule present in the House and are able to add unrelated amendments to the House bill to provide benefits to special interest groups and campaign contributors. Usually the amendments provide tax benefits or favorable trade treatments. Many Christmas tree bills are enacted in the crush of legislation as Congress prepares to adjourn for the Christmas holidays. These bills usually have the effect of reducing the amount of tax revenue collected by the federal government.

== Origins ==
It is unclear when the expression "Christmas tree bill" was coined and by whom, but in 1956, Time magazine published an article entitled "The Christmas Tree Bill". The story was about a farm bill to which more than one hundred amendments were introduced. Clinton Anderson, a Democratic Senator from New Mexico is quoted in the article saying, "This bill gets more and more like a Christmas tree; there's something on it for nearly everyone."

Louisiana Senator Russell B. Long, the chairman of the Senate Finance Committee from 1965 until 1981, has claimed that he was the creator of the Christmas tree bill. In 1966, the House passed H.R. 13103, the Foreign Investors Tax Act, a bill designed to reduce the complexity and confusion facing the foreign investor. It was intended to encourage foreign investment in the United States. By the time the bill was approved by the Senate, it included provisions that helped the mineral ore industry, large investors, hearse owners, and Scotch whisky importers. Chairman Long also was able to include a one-dollar income tax check off to assist presidential campaigns, a proposal he had championed for a number of years. Another controversial issue amended to the bill was a tax break for doctors, lawyers, and other high-paid professionals who wanted to set aside money for their retirements.

The House Ways and Means Committee initially threatened not to bring the bill to a conference committee because the Senate had amended the bill too heavily. With the addition of the retirement provision, the bill became more popular in the House because that chamber had passed the provision earlier in the year only to see it defeated by the Senate. The conference committee reduced some of the tax breaks in the bill. It then went to a House floor vote under a closed rule. House Ways and Means Committee chairman, Wilbur Mills of Arkansas, insisted that tax bills be debated under closed rules to keep them from being amended on the floor. The House eventually approved what Long considered the first Christmas tree bill.

== Political context ==
The traditional Christmas tree bill was expanded during the 1980s. Instead of amending tax bills, Members of Congress attached special-interest amendments to huge omnibus bills in order to keep them from attracting too much public attention. Continuing resolutions, the emergency spending bills enacted to keep the government operating without a budget, became a favored target. Some of these items were disguised to further keep them from public view. One provision included in the 1986 Tax Reform Act granted a tax exemption to a single company identified in the bill as a “corporation incorporated on June 13, 1917, which has its principal place of business in Bartlesville, Oklahoma” (Phillips Petroleum).

Christmas tree bills tend to split Congress by houses rather than by party. In 1983, Congress debated the Surface Transportation Technical Corrections Act. The bill started out as an ordinary piece of legislation to provide emergency highway money for states suffering flood damage. The House and Senate added projects worth $140 million including projects favored by Speaker Tip O'Neill of Massachusetts. Republicans also added projects to the bill. Oregon Senator Bob Packwood, angered at the concessions granted to the trucking industry, worked to block the bill’s final action in the Senate. The bill died under the weight of all of the gifts.

The 1995 District of Columbia budget bill was stalled in Congress for several months threatening to shut down city services. Senators had added a number of unrelated amendments to the spending bill. These amendments would have created an African American museum on the Mall in Washington, earmarked money to Haiti, and dealt with health care fraud. The Senate amendments were removed from the bill during negotiations in the conference committee and the bill was signed hours before the fiscal year started.

Christmas tree bills challenge the President who is limited to either signing such bills or vetoing entire bills. The Constitution prohibits the President from vetoing just those provisions they do not like.

In the New Jersey Legislature, the annual state budget bill takes the form of a Christmas tree bill, whereby hundreds of last-minute "Christmas tree items" requested by individual legislators can be added just before the bill is passed, increasing the final budget by millions of dollars. In California, where the state constitution limits bills to a single subject, a budget implementation bill called a "trailer bill" can be used to bypass the legislative process and enact wide-reaching policies having little to do with the budget. In addition, such bills are shielded from citizen-initiated veto referendums.

== See also ==
- Downsize DC Foundation
- Rider (legislation)
- Omnibus bill
