= PGY =

North American residency dating system

PGY, short for postgraduate year, is a North American numerical construct denoting the progress of postgraduate medical, dental, veterinary, podiatry or pharmacy residents in their residency programs. It is used to stratify responsibility in most training programs and to determine salary. The grade of a resident or fellow is denoted with an Arabic or Roman numeral after the PGY designation, such as PGY-3 for a third-year resident in any specialty.

The length of residency depends on the field a graduate chooses to take. Medical specialties such as family medicine and internal medicine often require three years, whereas surgery usually requires 5-7 years of training, and neurological surgery is the longest at 7 years. Subspecialization (vascular or orthopedic spine surgery as a branch of surgery, for example) in any field will add time to postgraduate training. Electrophysiology, for example, requires 8 total years of training - 3 years of internal medicine residency followed by 3 years for Cardiovascular Disease specialty training followed by 2 years of Clinical Cardiac Electrophysiology subspecialty training

Dental residencies, although not required to practice (similar to veterinary), are generally one year, with a possibility of a second year at some facilities. Dental specialties, such as orthodontics, require 2–4 years, while oral and maxillofacial surgery requires 4–6 years. Some specialty programs require that applicants have completed at least a one-year GPR (General practice residency), while other programs require applicants to have some private practice experience as a general dentist. Regardless of requirements, completing a GPR residency will make an applicant more competitive for any specialty program.

Medical physics residencies range between two and four years, with at least two years fulfilling the necessary clinical experience. Completion of a CAMPEP-accredited residency allows one to sit for board examinations administered through the American Board of Radiology. PGY-3, and/or if also available -4, generally consist of scholarly research years, akin to a postdoctoral research position. Residencies options are either radiation oncology physics or medical imaging.

Pharmacy residencies are usually one year, but a PGY-2 can be completed, often as an option, for pharmacy specialties such as critical care, cardiology, oncology, etc.

In some teaching institutions, trainees are required to indicate level of training on all signatures (John Doe, M.D., PGY-1 or R-1; or John Doe, D.O., PGY-1 or R-1).
