= National Matching Service =

National Matching Services (NMS) specializes in the development and administration of Matching Programs. NMS was founded in 1985, after developing sophisticated matching algorithms and software for the placement of physicians into residencies in the US. Since then, NMS has implemented Matching Programs in a number of industries and professions, including osteopathic medicine, psychology, dentistry, pharmacy, and optometry. NMS is headquartered in Toronto.

Matching Programs place applicants into positions based on lists of preferred choices submitted by applicants and recruiters. A Matching Program eliminates premature decisions based on incomplete information by allowing all offers, acceptances or rejections to occur at the same time. Therefore many common adverse situations are eliminated from the recruitment process, such as applicants hoarding multiple offers, applicants reneging on a prior acceptance in order to accept a more preferred subsequent offer, and recruiters overfilling the number of positions available. Applicants and recruiters benefit from having full choice of all potential placements. The best strategy for both applicants and recruiters is to submit preference lists that reflect their true preferences.
