= Match Day (medicine) =

Annual event for medical residency

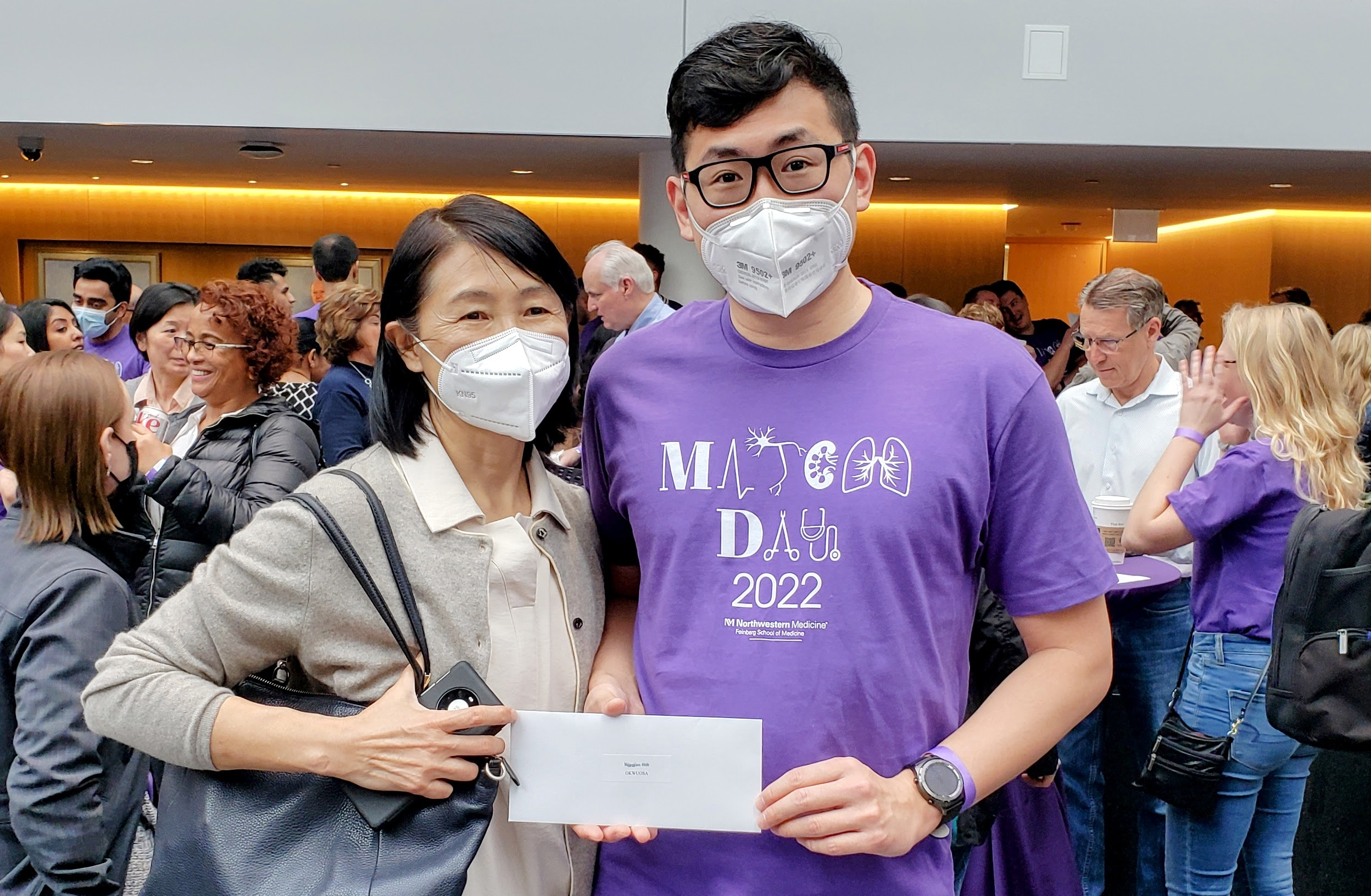
Northwestern University Feinberg School of Medicine student celebrating Match Day

Match Day is a term used widely in the graduate medical education community to represent the day when the National Resident Matching Program or NRMP releases results to applicants seeking residency and fellowship training positions in the United States. Match Day for the NRMP Main Residency Match is on the third Friday of March each year, and Match Day ceremonies occur at many of the 155 medical schools in the United States where those results are announced. Match Days for the NRMP Fellowship Matches occur throughout the year because each Fellowship Match has its own schedule of dates. Other matching plans like the American Urological Association, and the San Francisco Match (Ophthalmology and Plastic Surgery) have dates on which they release their results. By participating in a national matching plan, applicants contractually agree to attend the residency, internship or fellowship programs to which they match. The same agreement applies to the programs; they are obligated to train the applicants who match to them. In 2017, Match Day hit a record-high as 35,969 U.S. and international medical school students and graduates vied for 31,757 residency positions.

== Background ==
In the United States, senior medical students (both MD and DO) applicants and residency programs that register with the NRMP participate in a process known as "the Match." Applicants for the NRMP Main Residency Match usually begin the application process in the summer, and programs review applications and invite selected candidates for interviews held between October and February. After the interview period is over, applicants submit to the NRMP a "rank-order list" of programs where they wish to train. Similarly, residency programs submit a rank order list of applicants they prefer to train. The process is blinded so that neither applicants nor programs see each other's rank order lists. Aggregate Match results can be found on the NRMP public website.

The two parties' rank order lists are processed using the NRMP's matching algorithm, which creates stable (a proxy for optimal) matches between applicants and programs.

On the Monday prior to Match Day for the Main Residency Match, applicants find out from the NRMP if (but not where) they matched. Applicants who match to a training position must wait until the Match Day on Friday to learn the location of that position. Applicants who do not match to a training position in the Main Residency Match may be eligible to obtain an unfilled position through the Match Week Supplemental Offer and Acceptance Program that concludes on Thursday, the day prior to Match Day.

Although the majority of U.S. medical school seniors match to one of their top three program choices, applicants may match to programs lower on their rank order list, especially when their preferred specialty for training is among competitive specialties such as Plastic Surgery, Dermatology, Neurosurgery, Ophthalmology, Urology, Orthopedics, Otolaryngology, and Radiation Oncology.

== Military ==
Members of the U.S. military participate in their own selection process for programs located at military hospitals, clinics, and bases. The military selection usually occurs in mid-December to allow students who did not match to participate in other national matching plans.
