= Rider (legislation) =

Type of legislation

In legislative procedure, a rider is an additional provision added to a bill or other measure under consideration by a legislature, which may or may not have much, if any, connection with the subject matter of the bill.

Some scholars identify riders as a specific form of logrolling, or as implicit logrolling. Others distinguish riders from logrolling. Adding riders to legislation is not permitted in legislatures bound by a single-subject rule.

== United States ==
=== Federal legislation ===
In the U.S. Congress, riders have been a traditional method for members of Congress to advance controversial measures without building coalitions specifically in support of them, allowing the measure to move through the legislative process: "By combining measures, the legislative leadership can force members to accept a measure that might not survive alone because they want the entire bill to pass." Since the 1980s, however, omnibus bills have become more common: these bills contain provisions, sometime important provisions, on an array of policy areas, and "are powerful for focusing attention away from controversial items to other main items" that either have broad support or are viewed as necessary, "must-pass" measures (such as appropriation bills). While members of Congress often use riders to attempt to kill a piece of legislation, "omnibus bills are pursued in order to get something passed." The phrase "and for other purposes" is frequently included within bills, even if a rider is not initially attached, so as to permit riders unrelated to the original legislation to be added later.

When the veto is an all-or-nothing power as it is in the United States Constitution, the executive must either accept the riders or reject the entire bill. The practical consequence of the custom of using riders is to constrain the veto power of the executive.

The Line Item Veto Act of 1996 was passed to allow the President of the United States to veto single objectionable items within bills passed by Congress, but the Supreme Court struck down the act as unconstitutional in Clinton v. City of New York.

Riders may be unrelated to the subject matter of bills to which they are attached and are commonly used to introduce unpopular provisions. For example, a rider to stop net neutrality was attached to a bill relating to military and veteran construction projects. Another rider has been the Hyde Amendment which since 1976 has been attached to Appropriation Bills to prevent Medicaid paying for most abortions. Another was the Boland Amendment in 1982 and 1983 to restrict financing of the Contras in Nicaragua.

A recent notable example of a rider was in the Health Care and Education Reconciliation Act of 2010. An amended version of the Patient Protection and Affordable Care Act in 2010 that was signed into law by Barack Obama only one week before, the amended bill included a rider for the Student Aid and Fiscal Responsibility Act, whose student loan reform was completely unrelated to the broader bill's primary focus on health care reform.

=== State legislation ===
Riders exist at the state level as well. For just one example, a 2005 bill in West Virginia that was primarily focused on limiting the number of members that cities can appoint to boards of parks and recreation unexpectedly included a rider that made the English language the official language of the state of West Virginia. Most members of the West Virginia Legislature did not realize that the rider had been entered into the bill until it had already passed both state houses. Then-West Virginia governor Joe Manchin, although a personal supporter of the English-only movement, promptly vetoed the bill due to a provision in the Constitution of West Virginia that limits bills to one topic, which also makes riders de facto unconstitutional in West Virginia. To counteract riders, 43 of the 50 U.S. states have provisions in their state constitutions allowing the use of line item vetoes so that the executive can veto single objectionable items within a bill, without affecting the main purpose or effectiveness of the bill.

== Europe ==
=== France ===
The Constitutional Council of France has taken an increasingly hard view against riders, which it considers unconstitutional and contrary to the rules of procedure of the parliamentary assemblies. In 1985 the Council started striking down amendment to laws because they were unrelated to the subject of the law. Two special categories of riders merit mention: the "budgetary riders", attached to budget bills, and "social riders", attached to the budget bill for social security organizations, clauses that have no link to the budget or to the social security budgets, respectively.

=== Greece ===
Greece's constitutional provisions regarding parliamentary procedure forbid the parliamentary discussion of bills containing unrelated topics. Specifically, article 74, paragraph 5 of the Greek Constitution stipulates that a) a bill that contains provisions unrelated to its main subject is not introduced for discussion, and b) additions or amendments unrelated to the bill's main subject are not introduced for discussion.

=== Hungary ===
In 2005, the Constitutional Court of Hungary struck down the yearly national budget law in its entirety, because almost half of the paragraphs were not related to state fiscals at all, but modified 44 other existing pieces of legislation, which concerned health regulations, public education and foreign relations. This judicial ruling restricted the government's future options in bypassing due parliamentary debate and imposing certain reforms unilaterally.

=== United Kingdom ===
In some legislative systems, such as the British Parliament, riders are prevented by the existence of the long title of a bill that describes the full purpose of the bill. Any part of the bill that falls outside the scope of the long title would not be permitted. However, legislators often bypass this limitation by naming a bill vaguely, such as by appending "and for connected purposes" to the name.

=== The Czech Republic ===
Both Chamber of Deputies of The Czech Republic and Senate of The Czech Republic should respect the principles of transparent governance, and should be scrutinised by the opposition and the general public. Their final decision should follow a long and public debate on the subject of regulation. In The Czech Republic, however, this parliamentary principle is often violated by complex amendments to bills and so-called wild riders, amendments that are not substantively related to the bill in question.

In The Czech Republic, acceptance of legislative additions is contrary to the Constitution of the Czech Republic and the legislative procedure established by the Law of the Czech Republic. According to the conclusion of the Constitutional Court of the Czech Republic in its ruling Pl.ÚS 21/01, the legislative practice, when a single law amends several laws that are not directly related to each other in terms of content, does not correspond with the purpose and principles of the legislative process. Such a procedure would create an unclear legal situation which contradicts the fundamental principles of the rule of law. The basic principles of the rule of law are the principles of the predictability of the law, its comprehensibility, clarity and internal consistency, i.e. the coherence and unity of the legal order. The principle of the democratic rule of law is regulated by Articles 1 and 2 of the Constitution of the Czech Republic. According to Article 2(3), 'State power shall be at the service of all citizens and may be exercised only in the cases, within the limits and in the manner prescribed by the law'.

Up to date, there is no legislative regulation to prevent the practice of legislative riders. However, there are safeguards that should prevent the practice of wild riders. One of these safeguards is The Constitutional Court of the Czech Republic itself, whose role under Section 68(2) of The Constitutional Court Act of the Czech Republic is to determine whether a bill has been adopted and passed in a constitutionally-conforming manner. The Constitutional Court of the Czech Republic has taken hard view against wild riders. According to the conclusion of The Constitutional Court of the Czech Republic in its rulings Pl.ÚS 21/01 and Pl.ÚS 77/06, wild riders are unconstitutional and contrary to the law of legislative procedure and its principles.

==== PL. ÚS 21/01: Budget Case ====
What occurred in this particular budget case is that several statutes were simultaneously amended by a single statute, and among these amended statutes was an act on the State Budget. The Constitutional Court of the Czech Republic stated that the practice by which several diverse statutes are simultaneously amended by the adoption of a single statute is a relatively common one in legislative practice, and that this practice is in principle constitutionally conforming, but only in the case that the amended statutes bear mutual substantive connection to each other. However, in this case, the amended laws were not bearing any direct substantive connection to each other and were amended by a single act. Such practice, according to The Constitutional Court of the Czech Republic, must be designated as an undesirable phenomenon, and one not corresponding to the purpose and principles of the legislative process. The Constitutional Court of the Czech Republic further stated that the Rules of Procedure of the Chamber of Deputies regulate the discussion of the act on the State Budget, according to which 'The Act on the State Budget may not provide for changes, amendments or cancellations or other acts of law.'

==== PL. ÚS 77/06: Legislative Riders ====
As far as the issue of legislative riders is concerned, this ruling of The Constitutional Court of the Czech Republic is considered to be the most significant. In this case, The Constitutional Court of the Czech Republic had to assess whether the proposed amendment submitted by MP Michal Doktor concerned the same subject as the bill which was under consideration in the legislative process. The Constitutional Court of the Czech Republic deemed necessary to distinguish two types of proposed amendments. The first type of proposed amendment has long been designated in American doctrine as "legislative riders", which is considered to be a constitutionally-conforming form of proposed amendment. However, the second type, called "wild riders", is a technique in which a legislative scheme from an entirely different statute is attached to the bill in the form of a proposed amendment. The rule of close relation (the germaneness rule) has been applied. In other words, it tests the issue as to whether, in this particular case, a proposed amendment was a proper amendment or whether it was a wild rider. In this ruling, The Constitutional Court of the Czech Republic concluded that it takes a distinctly negative view of wild riders, especially because of their potential negative impact on the principles of the democratic rule of law, which are threatened by wild riders, which turned out to be crucial as a reference for future cases concerning wild riders.

== Philippines ==
The Congress of the Philippines is prohibited to add riders in bills. According to Article VI, Section 26(1) of the Constitution of the Philippines, bills must espouse a particular subject which has to be conveyed in the title thereof.

== Examples ==
- Salvage rider (1995)
- CISA Act (2015)
- REAL ID Act (2005)
- Illicit Drug Anti-Proliferation Act (2003)
- Lautenberg Amendment
- Hyde Amendment
- The rider "Confirmation of antitrust status of graduate medical resident matching programs" was attached to the Pension Funding Equity Act and gave the Association of American Medical Colleges a victory in the antitrust case Jung v. Association of American Medical Colleges.

== See also ==
- Christmas tree bill
- Cornhusker Kickback
- Downsize DC Foundation
- Omnibus spending bill
- Wrecking amendment
- Lex Caecilia Didia
