= Residency (medicine) =

Postgraduate medical training

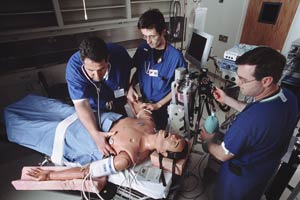
Anesthesia residents being led through training with a patient simulator

Residency or postgraduate training is a stage of graduate medical education. It refers to a qualified physician (one who holds the degree of MD, DO, MBBS/MBChB), veterinarian (DVM/VMD, BVSc/BVMS), dentist (DDS or DMD), podiatrist (DPM), optometrist (OD), pharmacist (PharmD), physical therapist (DPT), or Medical Laboratory Scientist (Doctor of Medical Laboratory Science) who practices medicine or surgery, veterinary medicine, dentistry, optometry, podiatry, clinical pharmacy, physical therapy, or Clinical Laboratory Science, respectively, usually in a hospital or clinic, under the direct or indirect supervision of a senior medical clinician registered in that specialty such as an attending physician or consultant.

The term residency is named as such due to resident physicians (resident doctors) of the 19th century residing at the dormitories of the hospital in which they received training.

In many jurisdictions, successful completion of such training is a requirement in order to obtain an unrestricted license to practice medicine, and in particular a license to practice a chosen specialty. In the meantime, they practice "on" the license of their supervising physician. An individual engaged in such training may be referred to as a resident physician, house officer, registrar or trainee depending on the jurisdiction. Residency training may be followed by fellowship or sub-specialty training.

Whereas medical school teaches physicians a broad range of medical knowledge, basic clinical skills, and supervised experience practicing medicine in a variety of fields, medical residency gives in-depth training within a specific branch of medicine.

== Terminology ==
A resident physician is more commonly referred to as a resident, senior house officer (in Commonwealth countries), or alternatively, a senior resident medical officer or house officer. Residents have graduated from an accredited medical school and hold a medical degree (MD, DO, MBBS, MBChB). Residents are, collectively, the house staff of a hospital. This term comes from the fact that resident physicians traditionally spend the majority of their training "in house" (i.e., the hospital). The similar term residency is named as such due to resident physicians of the 19th century residing at the dormitories of the hospital in which they received training.

Duration of residencies can range from two years to seven years, depending upon the program and specialty.

In the United States, the first year of residency is commonly called an internship with those physicians being termed interns. Depending on the number of years a specialty requires, the term junior resident may refer to residents who have not completed half their residency. Senior residents are residents in their final year of residency, although this can vary. Some residency programs refer to residents in their final year as chief residents (typically in surgical branches), while others select one or various residents to add administrative duties to the normal learning in the last year of residency. Alternatively, a chief resident may describe a resident who has been selected to extend his or her residency by one year and organize the activities and training of the other residents (typically in internal medicine and pediatrics).

If a physician finishes a residency and decides to further his or her education in a fellowship, they are referred to as a "fellow". Physicians who have fully completed their training in a particular field are referred to as attending physicians, or consultants (in Commonwealth countries). However, the above nomenclature applies only in educational institutes in which the period of training is specified in advance. In privately owned, non-training hospitals, in certain countries, the above terminology may reflect the level of responsibility held by a physician rather than their level of education.

== History ==
Residency as an opportunity for advanced training in a medical or surgical specialty evolved in the late 19th century from brief and informal programs for extra training in a special area of interest. The first formal residency programs were established by William Osler and William Stewart Halsted at Johns Hopkins Hospital in Baltimore. Residencies elsewhere then became formalized and institutionalized for the principal specialties in the early 20th century. But even mid-century, residency was not seen as necessary for general practice and only a minority of primary care physicians participated.

The expansion of medical residencies in the United States experienced a significant surge following World War II. In the post-war landscape, the demand for skilled physicians escalated, necessitating a robust training infrastructure. The G.I. Bill, a landmark piece of legislation, played a pivotal role in fueling this expansion by providing educational benefits to returning veterans, including those pursuing medical careers. The increased financial support facilitated a surge in medical school enrollments, spurring the need for expanded residency programs to accommodate the growing pool of aspiring physicians. This period witnessed the establishment of numerous new residency positions across various specialties. In 1940 there were approximately 6,000 residency positions available, but by 1970 the available spots had increased to more than 40,000. At the same time, the daily operation of the hospital increasingly relied on medical residents.

By the end of the 20th century in North America, few new doctors went directly from medical school into independent, unsupervised medical practice, and more state and provincial governments began requiring one or more years of postgraduate training for medical licensure.

Residencies are traditionally hospital-based, and in the middle of the 20th century, residents would often live (or "reside") in hospital-supplied housing. "Call" (night duty in the hospital) was sometimes as frequent as every second or third night for up to three years. Pay was minimal beyond room, board, and laundry services. It was assumed that most young men and women training as physicians had few obligations outside of medical training at that stage of their careers.

The first year of practical patient-care-oriented training after medical school has long been termed "internship". Even as late as the middle of the twentieth century, most physicians went into primary care practice after a year of internship. Residencies were separate from internship, often served at different hospitals, and only a minority of physicians did residencies.

In the United States, the Libby Zion case, which led to the Libby Zion Law, garnered attention in 1984, shed light on the demanding work hours imposed on medical residents. Responding to this concern, the Association of American Medical Colleges released a position statement in 1988, recommending a cap of 80 work hours per week for residents. Subsequently, in 1989, New York became the first state to address this issue by implementing regulations through the Health Code, marking a pivotal moment in the regulation of resident hours. These regulations, integrated into the state hospital code, included duty hour limits and supervision enhancements advocated by the Bell Commission. However, despite the issuance of regulations, compliance was slow to materialize, and a decade later, site visits revealed widespread noncompliance with the established limits. The efforts to address and regulate resident work hours culminated nationally in 2003 when the ACGME (Accreditation Council for Graduate Medical Education) mandated these limits across the United States.

== Residency around the world ==
=== Afghanistan ===
In Afghanistan, the residency (Dari, تخصص) consists of a three to seven years of practical and research activities in the field selected by the candidate. The graduate medical students do not need to complete the residency because they study medicine in six years (three years for clinical subjects, three years clinical subjects in hospital) and one-year internship and they graduate as general practitioner. Most students do not complete residency because it is too competitive.

=== Argentina ===
In Argentina, the residency (Spanish, residencia) consists of a three to four years of practical and research activities in the field selected by both the candidate and already graduated medical practitioners. Specialized fields such as neurosurgery or cardio-thoracic surgery require longer training. Through these years, consisting of internships, social services, and occasional research, the resident is classified according to their residency year as an R1, R2, R3 or R4. After the last year, the "R3 or R4 Resident" obtains the specialty (especialidad) in the selected field of medicine.

=== Australia ===
In Australia, specialist training is undertaken as a registrar; The term 'resident' is used synonymously with 'hospital medical officer' (HMO), and refers to unspecialised postgraduate medical practitioners prior to specialty training.

Entry into a specialist training program occurs after completing one year as an intern (post-graduate year 1 or "PGY1"), then, for many training programs, an additional year as a resident (PGY2 onward). Training lengths can range from 3 years for general practice to 7 years for paediatric surgery.

=== Canada ===
In Canada, Canadian medical graduates (CMGs), which includes final-year medical students and unmatched previous-year medical graduates, apply for residency positions via the Canadian Resident Matching Service (CaRMS). The first year of residency training is known as "Postgraduate Year 1" (PGY1).

CMGs can apply to many post-graduate medical training programs including family medicine, emergency medicine, internal medicine, pediatrics, general surgery, obstetrics-gynecology, neurology, and psychiatry, amongst others.

Some residency programs are direct-entry (family medicine, dermatology, neurology, general surgery, etc.), meaning that CMGs applying to these specialties do so directly from medical school. Other residencies have sub-specialty matches (internal medicine and pediatrics) where residents complete their first 2–3 years before completing a secondary match (Medicine subspecialty match (MSM) or Pediatric subspecialty match (PSM)). After this secondary match has been completed, residents are referred to as fellows. Some areas of subspecialty matches include cardiology, nephrology, gastroenterology, immunology, respirology, infectious diseases, rheumatology, endocrinology and more. Direct-entry specialties also have fellowships, but they are completed at the end of residency (typically 5 years).

=== Colombia ===
In Colombia, fully licensed physicians are eligible to compete for seats in residency programs. To be fully licensed, one must first finish a medical training program that usually lasts five to six years (varies between universities), followed by one year of medical and surgical internship. During this internship a national medical qualification exam is required, and, in many cases, an additional year of unsupervised medical practice as a social service physician. Applications are made individually program by program, and are followed by a postgraduate medical qualification exam. The scores during medical studies, university of medical training, curriculum vitae, and, in individual cases, recommendations are also evaluated. The acceptance rate into residencies is very low (~1–5% of applicants in public university programs), physician-resident positions do not have salaries, and the tuition fees reach or surpass US$10,000 per year in private universities and $2,000 in public universities. For the reasons mentioned above, many physicians travel abroad (mainly to Argentina, Brazil, Spain and the United States) to seek postgraduate medical training. The duration of the programs varies between three and six years. In public universities, and some private universities, it is also required to write and defend a medical thesis before receiving a specialist degree

=== France ===
In France, students attending clinical practice are known as "externes" and newly qualified practitioners training in hospitals are known as "internes". The residency, called "Internat", lasts from three to six years (depending on the speciality) and follows a competitive national ranking examination. It is customary to delay submission of a thesis. As in most other European countries, many years of practice at a junior level may follow.

French residents are often called "doctor" during their residency. Literally speaking, they are still students and become M.D. only at the end of their residency and after submitting and defending a thesis before a jury.

=== Germany ===
In Germany, postgraduate medical training leading to specialization is generally referred to as Facharztweiterbildung. After obtaining the required authorization to practise medicine, physicians can apply for positions in approved hospitals and training institutions and complete specialist training while working under supervision. For international medical graduates, the pathway typically involves recognition of their medical qualifications, fulfilment of language requirements, and the applicable medical licensing process.

=== Greece ===
In Greece, licensed physicians are eligible to apply for a position in a residency program. To be a licensed physician, one must finish a medical training program which in Greece lasts for six years. A one-year obligatory rural medical service (internship) is necessary to complete the residency training. Applications are made individually in the prefecture where the hospital is located, and the applicants are positioned on first-come, first-served basis. The duration of the residency programs varies between three and seven years.

=== India ===
In India, after completing MBBS degree and one year of integrated internship, doctors can enroll in several types of postgraduate training programs:

M.D. (DOCTOR OF MEDICINE) in: Anesthesiology, Anatomy, Biochemistry, Community Medicine, Dermatology Venereology and Leprosy, General Medicine, Forensic Medicine, Microbiology, Pathology, Paediatrics, Pharmacology, Physical medicine and rehabilitation, Physiology, Psychiatry, Radio diagnosis, Radiotherapy, Tropical Medicine, and, Tuberculosis & Respiratory Medicine.

M.S. (MASTER OF SURGERY) in: Otorhinolaryngology, General Surgery, Ophthalmology, Orthopaedics, Obstetrics & Gynecology.

D.M. (DOCTOR OF MEDICINE) in: Cardiology, Endocrinology, Medical Gastroenterology, Nephrology, and Neurology.

M.Ch. (MASTER OF CHIRURGIE) in: Cardio vascular & Thoracic Surgery, Urology, Neurosurgery, Paediatric Surgery, Plastic Surgery.

Or diploma in: Anesthesiology (D.A.), Clinical Pathology (D.C.P.), Dermatology Venereology and Leprosy (DDVL), Forensic Medicine (D.F.M.), Obstetrics & Gynaecology (D.G.O.), Ophthalmology (D.O.), Orthopedics (D.Ortho.), Otorhinolaryngology (D.L.O.), Paediatrics (D.C.H.) Psychiatry (D.P.M.), Public health (D.P.H.), Radio-diagnosis (D.M.R.D.), Radiotherapy (D.M.R.T.)., Tropical Medicine & Health (D.T.M. & H.), Tuberculosis & Chest Diseases (D.T.C.D.), Industrial Health (D.I.H.), Maternity & Child Welfare (D. M. C. W.)

=== Italy ===
In Italy, after completing a cycle of 6 years of studies, students get the title of "Medico generico" (generic physician), and are authorized to limited activities, like: teach first aid practices, act as temporary substitute of a primary care physician or issue medical certificates for sports purposes.

Later the physicians can complete the studies with a specialization training. Such specialization is required even to practice as family doctor or primary care physician.

Resident is translated as: "specializzanda" or "specializzando" according to gender.

=== Mexico ===
In Mexico, physicians need to take the ENARM (National Test for Aspirants to Medical Residency) (Spanish: Examen Nacional de Aspirantes a Residencias Médicas) in order to have a chance for a medical residency in the field they wish to specialize. The physician is allowed to apply to only one speciality each year. Some 35,000 physicians apply and only 8000 are selected. The selected physicians bring their certificate of approval to the hospital that they wish to apply (Almost all the hospitals for medical residency are from government based institutions). The certificate is valid only once per year and if the resident decides to drop residency and try to enter a different speciality she will need to take the test one more time (no limit of attempts). All the hosting hospitals are affiliated to a public/private university and this institution is the responsible to give the degree of "specialist". This degree is unique but equivalent to the MD used in the UK and India. In order to graduate, the trainee is required to present a thesis project and defend it.

The length of the residencies is very similar to the American system. The residents are divided per year (R1, R2, R3, etc.). After finishing, the trainee may decide if he wants to sub-specialize (equivalency to fellowship) and the usual length of sub-specialty training ranges from two to four years. In Mexico the term "fellow" is not used.

All the specialties in Mexico are board certified and some of them have a written and an oral component, making these boards ones of the most competitive in Latin America.

=== Nigeria ===
Medical residency in Nigeria is a structured postgraduate training program designed to produce specialists in various fields of medicine and dentistry. The training is overseen by two primary institutions:

- The National Postgraduate Medical College of Nigeria (NPMCN): Established in 1979, NPMCN is responsible for the training and certification of medical and dental specialists within Nigeria.
- The West African Postgraduate Medical Colleges: These are the West African College of Physicians (WACP) and the West African College of Surgeons (WACS), which coordinate regional training and certification across West Africa.

==== Entry requirements ====
To be eligible for residency training in Nigeria, candidates must:

1. Complete a Medical Degree: Obtain an MBBS or BDS degree from a recognized medical or dental school.
2. Housemanship: Complete a one-year internship (housemanship) in accredited hospitals.
3. National Youth Service Corps (NYSC): Fulfill the mandatory one-year national service.
4. Primary Examination: Pass the Primary Fellowship Examination conducted by either NPMCN or WACP/WACS, which assesses foundational knowledge in the chosen specialty.

==== Structure ====
Residency training in Nigeria is divided into two main phases:

===== Junior residency (Part I) =====
- Duration: 24 to 36 months.
- Objective: Develop core clinical competencies and foundational knowledge in the chosen specialty.
- Assessment: Candidates are eligible to sit for the Part I Fellowship Examination after completing this phase.

===== Senior residency (Part II) =====
- Duration: Varies depending on the specialty and institution.
- Objective: Advanced training with increased responsibilities, including research and teaching.
- Assessment: Completion of a dissertation and successful performance in the Part II Fellowship Examination.

==== Available faculties and specialties ====
===== National Postgraduate Medical College of Nigeria (NPMCN) =====
NPMCN offers residency training across 16 faculties encompassing medical, surgical, and dental specialties:

- Anaesthesia
- Dental Surgery
- Emergency Medicine
- Family Medicine
- Family Dentistry
- Internal Medicine
- Obstetrics and Gynaecology
- Ophthalmology
- Orthopaedics
- Otorhinolaryngology (ENT)
- Paediatrics
- Pathology
- Psychiatry
- Public Health and Community Medicine
- Radiology
- Surgery

===== West African College of Surgeons (WACS) =====
WACS provides training in various surgical specialties through its faculties:

- Anaesthesia
- Dental Surgery
- Obstetrics and Gynaecology
- Ophthalmology
- Orthopaedics
- Otorhinolaryngology
- Radiology
- General Surgery

===== West African College of Physicians (WACP) =====
WACP oversees training in medical specialties through its faculties:

- Community Health
- Family Medicine
- Internal Medicine
- Laboratory Medicine (including Anatomical Pathology, Chemical Pathology, Haematology, and Medical Microbiology)
- Paediatrics
- Psychiatry

==== Accreditation and regulation ====
- Training Institutions: Hospitals and medical centers must be accredited by NPMCN and/or WACP/WACS to offer residency programs.
- Medical and Dental Council of Nigeria (MDCN): MDCN regulates medical and dental practice in Nigeria, ensuring that residency training aligns with national standards.

==== Curriculum and evaluation ====
The residency curriculum encompasses:

- Clinical Training: Hands-on experience in patient care under supervision.
- Research: Residents are required to undertake research projects, culminating in a dissertation.
- Teaching: Involvement in the education of medical students and junior colleagues.
- Continuous Assessment: Regular evaluations through examinations, logbooks, and performance appraisals.

==== Challenges and developments ====
The residency training system in Nigeria faces several challenges:

- Funding: Inadequate financial support for training programs and research activities.
- Brain Drain: Migration of trained specialists to other countries in search of better opportunities.
- Infrastructure: Limited access to modern medical facilities and equipment in some training centers.

Efforts are ongoing to address these issues through policy reforms, increased funding, and international collaborations.

=== Pakistan ===
In Pakistan, after completing a MBBS degree and further completing a one year house job, doctors can enroll in two types of postgraduate residency programs. The first is a MS/MD program run by various medical universities throughout the country. It is a 4–5-year program depending upon the specialty. The second is a fellowship program which is called Fellow of College of Physicians and Surgeons Pakistan (FCPS) by the College of Physicians and Surgeons Pakistan (CPSP). It is also a 4–5-year program depending upon the specialty.

There are also post-fellowship programs offered by the College of Physicians and Surgeons Pakistan as a second fellowship in subspecialties.

=== Portugal ===
In Portugal, a resident physician is one undergoing postgraduate training aimed at obtaining a medical specialty. This training period begins after completing medical school and can last between 5 and 7 years, depending on the chosen specialty. At the end of their residency, physicians attain the status of specialist.

The Medical Residency in Portugal is regulated by Decree-Law No. 60/2007, of March 13, and by Ordinance No. 183/2006, of February 22 (Medical Residency Regulation). It is organized into two training periods: the Common Year and the Professional Specialization Area. Until 2004, the residency was divided into General (2 years) and Complementary (3 to 6 years) phases.

Upon completing medical school, doctors apply to a national competition for admission into the Medical Residency. This competition determines their placement for training locations and specialties, prioritizing the score obtained in a national ranking exam (a test with one hundred questions and five multiple-choice answers). The second criterion, used only in cases of a tie, is the medical school final grade. There is frequent confusion between a resident physician and an internal medicine specialist, also known as an internist. These terms are not synonymous, even though a resident physician may be pursuing specialization in internal medicine.

The Portuguese Medical Association is the entity that regulates medical practice in Portugal, ensuring the technical-scientific postgraduate training of its members through residency programs, which grant physicians specialist status.

=== Saudi Arabia ===
In Saudi Arabia, an MD must pass the Saudi Medical License Exam (SMLE) to apply for medical residency programs. The competitiveness of residency programs varies by specialty and region, with Plastic Surgery, Ophthalmology, Dermatology, and ENT being the most competitive. Residency durations range from 3 to 7 years, depending on the specialty. All residency programs include an end-of-training medical exam, which is conducted in English, as a requirement for board certification.

=== South Korea ===
1-year internship is obligatory to enter 3–4 year residency.

=== Spain ===
All Spanish medical degree holders need to pass a competitive national exam (named 'MIR') in order to access the specialty training program. This exam gives them the opportunity to choose both the specialty and the hospital where they will train, among the hospitals in the Spanish Healthcare Hospital Network. Currently, medical specialties last from 4 to 5 years.

There are plans to change the training program system to one similar to the UK's. There have been some talks between Ministry of Health, the Medical College of Physicians and the Medical Student Association but it is not clear how this change process is going to be.

=== Sweden ===
==== Prerequisites for applying to a specialist training program ====
A physician practicing in Sweden may apply to a specialist training program (Swedish: Specialisttjänstgöring) after being licensed as a physician by The National Board of Health and Welfare. To obtain a license through the Swedish education system a candidate must go through several steps. First the candidate must successfully finish a five-and-a-half-year undergraduate program, made up of two years of pre-clinical studies and three and a half years of clinical postings, at one of Sweden's seven medical schools—Uppsala University, Lund University, The Karolinska Institute, The University of Gothenburg, Linköping University, Umeå University, or Örebro University—after which a degree of Master of Science in Medicine (Swedish: Läkarexamen) is awarded. The degree makes the physician eligible for an internship (Swedish: Allmäntjänstgöring) ranging between 18 and 24 months, depending on the place of employment.

The internship is regulated by the National Board of Health and Welfare and regardless of place of employment it is made up of four main postings with a minimum of nine months divided between internal medicine and surgery—with no less than three months in each posting—three months in psychiatry, and six months in general practice. It is customary for many hospitals to post interns for an equal amount of time in surgery and internal medicine (e.g. six months in each of the two). An intern is expected to care for patients with a certain degree of independence but is under the supervision of more senior physicians who may or may not be on location.

During each clinical posting the intern is evaluated by senior colleagues and is, if deemed having skills corresponding to the goals set forth by The National Board of Health and Welfare, passed individually on all four postings and may go on to take a written exam on common case presentations in surgery, internal medicine, psychiatry, and general practice.

After passing all four main postings of the internship and the written exam, the physician may apply to The National Board of Health and Welfare to be licensed as a Doctor of Medicine. Upon application the physician has to pay a licensing fee of SEK 2,300—approximately equivalent to EUR 220 or USD 270, as per exchange rates on 24 April 2018—out of pocket, as it is not considered to be an expense directly related to medical school and thus is not covered by the state.

Physicians who have a foreign medical degree may apply for a license through different paths, depending on whether they are licensed in another EU or EEA country or not.

==== Specialty selection ====
The Swedish medical specialty system is, as of 2015, made up of three different types of specialties; base specialties, subspecialties, and add-on specialties. Every physician wishing to specialize starts by training in a base specialty and can thereafter go on to train in a subspecialty specific to their base specialty. Add-on specialties also require previous training in a base specialty or subspecialty but are less specific in that they, unlike subspecialties, can be entered into through several different previous specialties.

Furthermore, the base specialties are grouped into eight classes—pediatric specialties, imaging and functional medicine specialties, independent base specialties, internal medicine specialties, surgical specialties, laboratory specialties, neurological specialties, and psychiatric specialties.

It is a requirement that all base specialty training programs are at least five years in length. Common reasons for base specialty training taking longer than five years is paternity or maternity leave or simultaneous Ph.D. studies.

===== Base specialties and subspecialties =====
Medical base specialties and subspecialties in Sweden as of 2015
Specialty classes	Base specialties	Subspecialties
Pediatric specialties	Pediatrics	Pediatric allergology
Pediatric specialties	Pediatrics	Pediatric hematology and oncology
Pediatric specialties	Pediatrics	Pediatric cardiology
Pediatric specialties	Pediatrics	Pediatric neurology including habilitation
Pediatric specialties	Pediatrics	Neonatology
Imaging and functional medicine specialties	Clinical physiology	
Imaging and functional medicine specialties	Radiology	Neuroradiology
Independent base specialties	Emergency medicine	
Independent base specialties	General practice	
Independent base specialties	Occupational and environmental medicine	
Independent base specialties	Dermatology and venereology	
Independent base specialties	Infectious diseases	
Independent base specialties	Clinical pharmacology	
Independent base specialties	Clinical genetics	
Independent base specialties	Oncology	
Independent base specialties	Rheumatology	
Independent base specialties	Forensic medicine	
Independent base specialties	Social medicine	
Internal medicine specialties	Endocrinology and diabetology	
Internal medicine specialties	Geriatrics	
Internal medicine specialties	Hematology	
Internal medicine specialties	Internal medicine	
Internal medicine specialties	Cardiology	
Internal medicine specialties	Pulmonology	
Internal medicine specialties	Medical gastroenterology and hepatology	
Internal medicine specialties	Nephrology	
Surgical specialties	Anesthesiology and intensive care	
Surgical specialties	Pediatric surgery	
Surgical specialties	Hand surgery	
Surgical specialties	Surgery	
Surgical specialties	Vascular surgery	
Surgical specialties	Obstetrics and gynecology	
Surgical specialties	Orthopedics	
Surgical specialties	Plastic surgery	
Surgical specialties	Thoracic surgery	
Surgical specialties	Urology	
Surgical specialties	Ophthalmology	
Surgical specialties	Otorhinolaryngology	Disorders of hearing and balance
Surgical specialties	Otorhinolaryngology	Disorders of voice and speech
Laboratory specialties	Clinical immunology and transfusion medicine	
Laboratory specialties	Clinical chemistry	
Laboratory specialties	Clinical microbiology	
Laboratory specialties	Clinical pathology	
Neurological specialties	Clinical neurophysiology	
Neurological specialties	Neurosurgery	
Neurological specialties	Neurology	
Neurological specialties	Rehabilitation medicine	
Psychiatric specialties	Pediatric psychiatry	
Psychiatric specialties	Psychiatry	Forensic psychiatry

===== Add-on Specialties =====
====== Allergology ======
To train in the add-on specialty of allergology a physician must first be a specialist in general practice, occupational and environmental medicine, pediatric allergology, endocrinology and diabetology, geriatrics, hematology, dermatology and venerology, internal medicine, cardiology, clinical immunology and transfusion medicine, pulmonology, medical gastroenterology and hepatology, nephrology or otorhinolaryngology.

====== Occupational medicine ======
To train in the add-on specialty of occupational medicine a physician must first be a specialist in one of the pediatric class specialties, one of the independent class specialties (excluding clinical pharmacology, clinical genetics, forensic medicine, and social medicine), one of the internal medicine class specialties, one of the neurological class specialties (excluding clinical neurophysiology) or one of the psychiatric class specialties.

====== Addiction medicine ======
To train in the add-on specialty of addiction medicine a physician must first be a specialist in pediatric psychiatry or psychiatry.

====== Gynecologic oncology ======
To train in the add-on specialty of gynecologic oncology a physician must first be a specialist in obstetrics and gynecology or oncology.

====== Nuclear medicine ======
To train in the add-on specialty of nuclear medicine a physician must first be a specialist in clinical physiology, oncology or radiology.

====== Palliative medicine ======
To train in the add-on specialty of palliative medicine a physician must first be a specialist in one of the pediatric class specialties, one of the independent class specialties (excluding occupational and environmental medicine, clinical pharmacology, clinical genetics, forensic medicine, and social medicine), one of the internal medicine class specialties, one of the surgical class specialties, one of the neurological class specialties (excluding clinical neurophysiology) or one of the psychiatric class specialties.

====== School health ======
To train in the add-on specialty of school health a physician must first be a specialist in general practice, pediatrics or pediatric psychiatry.

====== Pain medicine ======
To train in the add-on specialty of pain medicine a physician must first be a specialist in one of the pediatric class specialties, one of the independent class specialties (excluding clinical pharmacology, clinical genetics, forensic medicine, and social medicine), one of the internal medicine class specialties, one of the surgical class specialties, one of the neurological class specialties (excluding clinical neurophysiology) or one of the psychiatric class specialties.

====== Infection control ======
To train in the add-on specialty of infection control a physician must first be a specialist in infectious diseases or clinical microbiology.

====== Geriatric psychiatry ======
To train in the add-on specialty of geriatric psychiatry a physician must first be a specialist in geriatrics or psychiatry.

==== Application process ====
There is no centralized selection process for internship or residency positions. The application process is more similar to that of other jobs on the market—i.e. application via cover letter and curriculum vitae. Both types of positions are however usually publicly advertised and many hospitals have nearly synchronous recruitment processes once or twice per year—the frequency of recruitment depending mainly on hospital size—for their internship positions.

===== Factors =====
Apart from the requirement that candidates are graduates from approved medical programs and, in the case of residency, licensed as medical doctors, there are no specific criteria an employer has to consider in hiring for an internship or residency position. This system for recruiting has been criticized by The Swedish Medical Association for lacking transparency as well as for delaying time to specialist certification of physicians.

There are nevertheless factors that most employers will consider, the most important being how long a doctor has been in active practice. After completing nine out of a total of eleven semesters of medical school a student may work as a physician on a temporary basis—e.g. during summer breaks from university. This rule enables medical graduates to start working as physicians upon graduating from university without yet being licensed, as a way of building experience to be able to eventually be hired into an internship. According to a 2017 survey by The Swedish Medical Association, interns in the country as a whole had worked an average of 10.3 months as physicians before starting their internships, ranging from an average of 5.1 months for interns in the Dalarna region to an average of 19.8 months for interns in the Stockholm region.

In recruitment for residency positions less emphasis is often placed on the number of months a candidate has worked after finishing their internship, but it is common for physicians to work for some time in between internship and residency, much in the same way as between medical school and internship.

=== Thailand ===
In Thailand, postgraduate medical training is monitored by the Medical Council of Thailand (TMC) and conducted by their respective "Royal Colleges".

Thailand has a significant issue with an imbalance of medical personnel between Bangkok and the remaining 76 provinces. As a primate city, the majority of specialists wish to remain in Bangkok after training. Each year, the TMC outlines the requirements for application to a certain specialty, depending on the needs of the country for staff within that field. Specialities are therefore classified into tiers depending on national demand. The duration spent in the national internship program depends on the specialty the graduate wishes to study. Specialties classified as 'lacking' may require only one year of internship, whilst more competitive specialties often require the full three-year duration of internship to meet the application criteria. Fields classified as 'severely lacking' may not require internship training at all.

Application to residency may be done on contract with a government hospital or without a contract, namely 'free-training'. Government hospitals may sign contracts to sponsor residency training for specialist doctors they require. In these cases, the duration for internship required in more popular fields may be reduced. For example, a residency in internal medicine requires three years of internship if applying without contract, but is reduced to two years if applying under contract. However at the end of training, specialists under contract must return to work at that particular hospital for a minimum of the duration of residency.

Most residency programs in Thailand consist of three to four years of training. The duration of training may be up to five or six years in certain specialties. Applications are sent to the Royal College overseeing their desired specialty and candidates may apply to no more than five institutes that conduct training in that specialty. As of 2022, there were 40 base specialties and 49 subspecialties. Subspecialty training (fellowship) requires initial training in the respective base specialty and is generally 1–2 years in duration.

==== Base specialties ====
Base Specialties in Thailand as of 2022
Tier	Notes	Base Specialties
Tier 1.1	Internship training not required. Medical school graduates can apply directly after graduation. Generally classified as 'severely lacking'.	Anatomical Pathology
Tier 1.1	Internship training not required. Medical school graduates can apply directly after graduation. Generally classified as 'severely lacking'.	Clinical Pathology
Tier 1.1	Internship training not required. Medical school graduates can apply directly after graduation. Generally classified as 'severely lacking'.	Transfusion Medicine
Tier 1.2	One year of internship training required. Generally classified as 'lacking'.	Psychiatry
Tier 1.2	One year of internship training required. Generally classified as 'lacking'.	Child and Adolescent Psychiatry
Tier 1.2	One year of internship training required. Generally classified as 'lacking'.	Addiction Psychiatry
Tier 1.2	One year of internship training required. Generally classified as 'lacking'.	Forensic Medicine
Tier 1.2	One year of internship training required. Generally classified as 'lacking'.	Neurosurgery
Tier 1.2	One year of internship training required. Generally classified as 'lacking'.	Radiation Oncology
Tier 1.2	One year of internship training required. Generally classified as 'lacking'.	Nuclear Medicine
Tier 1.2	One year of internship training required. Generally classified as 'lacking'.	Emergency Medicine
Tier 1.2	One year of internship training required. Generally classified as 'lacking'.	Family Medicine
Tier 1.2	One year of internship training required. Generally classified as 'lacking'.	Oncology
Tier 1.2	One year of internship training required. Generally classified as 'lacking'.	Hematology
Tier 2.1	One year of internship if applying under government contract. Two years of internship if applying without contract.	Rehabilitation medicine
Tier 2.1	One year of internship if applying under government contract. Two years of internship if applying without contract.	Diagnostic radiology
Tier 2.1	One year of internship if applying under government contract. Two years of internship if applying without contract.	Anesthesiology
Tier 2.1	One year of internship if applying under government contract. Two years of internship if applying without contract.	Pediatric hematology and oncology
Tier 2.1	One year of internship if applying under government contract. Two years of internship if applying without contract.	Pediatric surgery
Tier 2.1	One year of internship if applying under government contract. Two years of internship if applying without contract.	General surgery
Tier 2.1	One year of internship if applying under government contract. Two years of internship if applying without contract.	Cardiothoracic surgery
Tier 2.1	One year of internship if applying under government contract. Two years of internship if applying without contract.	Obstetrics and gynaecology
Tier 2.2	One year of internship if applying under government contract. Three years of internship if applying without contract.	Pediatrics
Tier 2.2	One year of internship if applying under government contract. Three years of internship if applying without contract.	Internal medicine
Tier 2.2	One year of internship if applying under government contract. Three years of internship if applying without contract.	Neurology
Tier 2.2	One year of internship if applying under government contract. Three years of internship if applying without contract.	Orthopedics
Tier 2.2	One year of internship if applying under government contract. Three years of internship if applying without contract.	Otorhinolaryngology
Tier 2.2	One year of internship if applying under government contract. Three years of internship if applying without contract.	Urology
Tier 2.2	One year of internship if applying under government contract. Three years of internship if applying without contract.	Preventive medicine (epidemiology)
Tier 2.2	One year of internship if applying under government contract. Three years of internship if applying without contract.	Preventive medicine (aviation medicine)
Tier 2.2	One year of internship if applying under government contract. Three years of internship if applying without contract.	Preventive medicine (clinical preventive medicine)
Tier 2.2	One year of internship if applying under government contract. Three years of internship if applying without contract.	Preventive medicine (occupational medicine)
Tier 2.2	One year of internship if applying under government contract. Three years of internship if applying without contract.	Preventive medicine (travel medicine)
Tier 2.2	One year of internship if applying under government contract. Three years of internship if applying without contract.	Preventive medicine (maritime medicine)
Tier 2.2	One year of internship if applying under government contract. Three years of internship if applying without contract.	Preventive medicine (traffic medicine)
Tier 2.2	One year of internship if applying under government contract. Three years of internship if applying without contract.	Preventive medicine (public health)
Tier 2.2	One year of internship if applying under government contract. Three years of internship if applying without contract.	Preventive medicine (community mental health)
Tier 3.1	Two years of internship if applying under government contract. Three years of internship if applying without contract.	Ophthalmology
Tier 3.2	Three years of internship required.	Dermatology
Tier 3.2	Three years of internship required.	Plastic surgery

=== United Kingdom ===
==== History ====
In the United Kingdom, house officer posts used to be optional for those going into general practice, but almost essential for progress in hospital medicine. The Medical Act 1956 made satisfactory completion of one year as house officer necessary to progress from provisional to full registration as a medical practitioner. The term "intern" was not used by the medical profession, but the general public were introduced to it by the US television series Dr. Kildare. They were usually called "housemen", but the term "resident" was also used unofficially. In some hospitals the "resident medical officer" (RMO) (or "resident surgical officer" etc.) was the most senior of the live-in medical staff of that specialty.

The pre-registration house officer posts lasted six months, and it was necessary to complete one surgical and one medical post. Obstetrics could be substituted for either. In principle, general practice in a "Health Centre" was also allowed, but this was almost unheard of. The posts did not have to be in general medicine: some teaching hospitals had very specialised posts at this level, so it was possible for a new graduate to do neurology plus neurosurgery or orthopaedics plus rheumatology, for one year before having to go onto more broadly based work. The pre-registration posts were nominally supervised by the General Medical Council, which in practice delegated the task to the medical schools, who left it to the consultant medical staff. The educational value of these posts varied enormously.

On-call work in the early days was full time, with frequent night shifts and weekends on call. One night in two was common, and later one night in three. This meant weekends on call started at 9 am on Friday and ended at 5 pm on Monday (80 hours). Less acute specialties such as dermatology could have juniors permanently on call. The European Union's Working Time Directive conflicted with this: at first the UK negotiated an opt-out for some years, but working hours needed reform. On call time was unpaid until 1975 (the year of the house officers' one-day strike), and for a year or two depended on certification by the consultant in charge – a number of them refused to sign. On call time was at first paid at 30% of the standard rate. Before paid on call was introduced, there would be several house officers "in the house" at any one time and the "second on call" house officer could go out, provided they kept the hospital informed of their telephone number at all times.

A "pre-registration house officer" would go on to work as a "senior house officer" for at least one year before seeking a registrar post. SHO posts could last six months to a year, and junior doctors often had to travel around the country to attend interviews and move house every six months while constructing their own training scheme for general practice or hospital specialisation. Locum posts could be much shorter. Organised schemes were a later development, and do-it-yourself training rotations became rare in the 1990s. Outpatients were not usually a junior house officer's responsibility, but such clinics formed a large part of the workload of more senior trainees, often with little real supervision.

Registrar posts lasted one or two years, and sometimes much longer outside an academic setting. It was common to move from one registrar post to another. Fields such as psychiatry and radiology used to be entered at the registrar stage, but the other registrars would usually have passed part one of a higher qualification, such as a Royal College membership or fellowship before entering that grade. Part two (the complete qualification) was necessary before obtaining a senior registrar post, usually linked to a medical school, but many left hospital practice at this stage rather than wait years to progress to a consultant post.

Most British clinical diplomas (requiring one or two years' experience) and membership or fellowship exams were not tied to particular training grades, though the length of training and nature of experience might be specified. Participation in an approved training scheme was required by some of the royal colleges. The sub-specialty exams in surgery, now for Fellowship of the Royal College of Surgeons, were originally limited to senior registrars. These rules prevented many of those in non-training grades from qualifying to progress.

Once a senior registrar, depending on specialty, it could take anything from one to six years to go onto a permanent consultant or senior lecturer appointment. It might be necessary to obtain an M.D. or Ch. M. degree and to have substantial published research. Transfer to general practice or a less favoured specialty could be made at any stage along this pathway: Lord Moran famously referred to general practitioners as those who had "fallen off the ladder".

There were also permanent non-training posts at sub-consultant level: previously senior hospital medical officer and medical assistant (both obsolete) and now staff grade, specialty doctor and associate specialist. The regulations did not call for much experience or any higher qualifications, but in practice both were common, and these grades had high proportions of overseas graduates, ethnic minorities and women.

Research fellows and PhD candidates were often clinical assistants, but a few were senior or specialist registrars. A large number of "Trust Grade" posts had been created by the new NHS trusts for the sake of the routine work, and many juniors had to spend time in these posts before moving between the new training grades, although no educational or training credit was given for them. Holders of these posts might work at various levels, sharing duties with a junior or middle grade practitioner or with a consultant.

In 2005, the structure of medical training was reformed when the Modernising Medical Careers (MMC) reform programme was instituted. House officers and the first year of senior house officer jobs were replaced by a compulsory two-year foundation training programme, followed by competitive entry into a formal specialty-based training programme. Registrar and Senior Registrar grades had been merged in 1995/6 as the specialist registrar (SpR) grade. Following MMC these posts were replaced by the merged Specialty Registrar (StR) role. StRs may be in post up to eight years, depending on the field.

The structure of the training programmes varies with specialty but there are five broad categories:

- Themed core specialties (A&E, Intensive Therapy Unit [ITU] and anaesthetics)
- Surgical specialties
- Medical specialties
- Psychiatry
- Run-through specialties (e.g., general practice, clinical radiology, pathology, paediatrics)

The first four categories all run on a similar structure: the Trainee first completes a two-year structured and broad-based core training programme in that field (e.g., core medical training), which makes them eligible for competitive entry into an associated specialty training scheme (e.g., gastroenterology if core medical training has been completed). The Core training years are referred to as CT1 and CT2, and the specialist years are ST3 onwards until completing training. Core training and the first year or two of speciality training are equivalent to the old Senior House Officer jobs.

It is customary for trainees in these areas to sit their Membership examinations (e.g., Royal College of Physicians (MRCP), Royal College of Surgeons (MRCS)) in order to progress and compete for designated sub-specialty training programmes that attract a national training number as specialty training year 3 (ST3) and beyond – up to ST9 depending on the particular training specialty.

In the fifth category, the trainee immediately starts specialty training (ST1 instead of CT1) progressing up to Consultant level without break or further competitive application process (run-through training). Most of the run-through schemes are in stand-alone specialties (e.g., radiology, public health, histopathology), but there are also a few traditionally surgical specialities which can be entered directly without completing core surgical training (e.g., neurosurgery, obstetrics & gynaecology, ophthalmology). The length of this training varies; for example, general practice is three years while radiology is five years.

The UK grade equivalent of a US fellow in medical/surgical sub-specialties is the specialty registrar (ST3–ST9) grade of sub-specialty training. However, while US fellowship programmes are generally 2–3 years in duration after completing the residency, UK trainees spend 4–7 years. This generally includes service provision in the main specialty; this discrepancy lies in the competing demands of NHS service provision, and UK postgraduate training stipulating that even specialist registrars must be able to accommodate the general acute medical take—almost equivalent to what dedicated attending internists perform in the United States (they still remain minimally supervised for these duties).

In 2024, the British Medical Association (BMA) advocated for all junior doctors to be renamed residents to prevent the confusion between resident doctors and medical students that terms such as "junior doctors" and "doctors in training" produce.

In September 2024, following the resolution of a prolonged pay dispute, it was announced that the term "junior doctor" within the NHS would be replaced with "resident doctor." This change was set to take effect on Wednesday, 18 September 2024.

=== United States ===
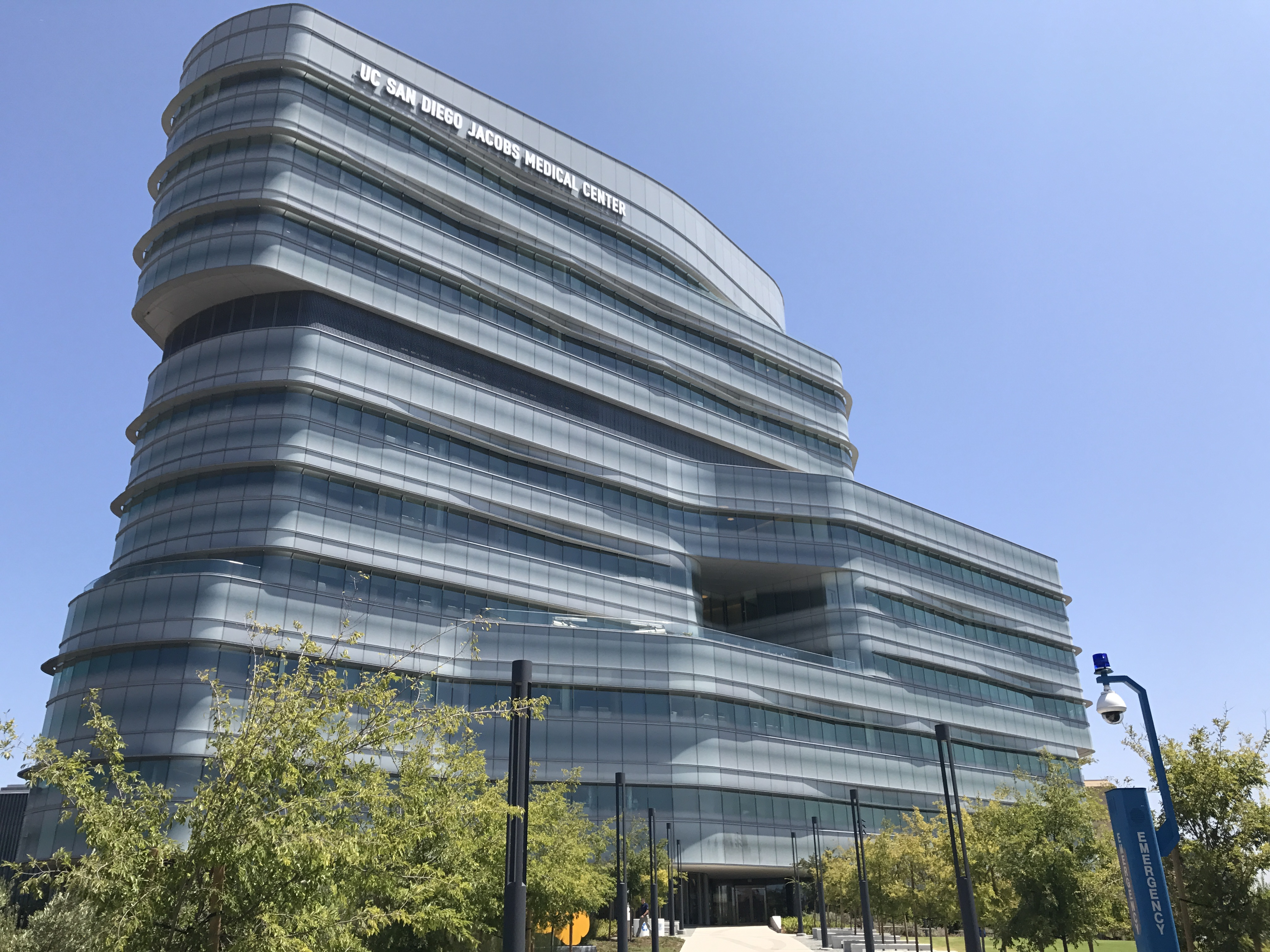
Jacobs Medical Center in San Diego, the primary teaching hospital for the University of California, San Diego School of Medicine.

Medical licensure in the United States is governed by state boards of medicine. In most states, graduates of US medical schools may obtain a full medical license after passage of the third step of the United States Medical Licensing Examination (USMLE), and at least one year of postgraduate education—i.e. one year of residency; usually called an internship. However, in most states, international medical graduates are required longer periods of training as well as passage of the third and final step of the USMLE, to obtain a full medical license. Physicians who have full medical licenses may practice medicine without supervision ("moonlight") in settings such as urgent care clinics and rural hospitals while in residency. However, while performing the requirements of their residency, residents are supervised by attending physicians who must approve their decisions.

==== Specialty selection ====
Specialties differ in length of training, availability of residencies, and options. Specialist residency programs require participation for completion ranging from three years for family medicine to seven years for neurosurgery. This time does not include any fellowship that may be required to be completed after residency to further sub-specialize.

In regard to options, specialty residency programs can range nationally from over 700 (family medicine) and over 580 (internal medicine) to 33 programs for integrated thoracic surgery and 28 programs for osteopathic neuromusculoskeletal medicine.

Residents choose the teaching hospital where they want to perform their residency based upon many factors, including the medical specialties offered by the hospital and reputation and credentials of the hospital. The following table shows medical specialties and the residency training times for medical specialties, as reported by the American Medical Association in 2021.

Length of medical residency training in the United States
Years	Medical specialties
Three	Emergency medicine (some); Anatomic pathology; Clinical pathology; Family medicine; Internal medicine; Medical genetics and genomics; Osteopathic neuromusculoskeletal medicine—up to 5 years depending on program; Pediatrics; Preventive medicine; Occupational and environmental medicine
Four	Anesthesiology; Emergency medicine (some); Internal medicine—pediatrics; Nuclear medicine; Obstetrics and gynaecology; Ophthalmology; Dermatology; Adult neurology; Psychiatry; Physical medicine and rehabilitation; Anatomical pathology and clinical pathology, combined training
Five	Child neurology; Diagnostic radiology; Orthopedic surgery; Otorhinolaryngology—ear, nose and throat surgery; Radiation oncology; General surgery; Urology—up to 6 years depending on program; Vascular surgery
Six	Plastic surgery—integrated; Interventional radiology—up to 7 years depending on program; Cardiothoracic surgery—up to 7 years depending on program; Oral and maxillofacial surgery—4 or 6 years depending on program
Seven	Neurosurgery

==== Application process ====
===== Factors =====
There are many factors that can go into what makes an applicant more or less competitive. According to a survey of residency program directors by the NRMP in 2020, the following five factors were mentioned by directors over 75% of the time as having the most impact:

Factors for obtaining a medical residency in the United States
Factor	2012	2020
Step 1 score	82%	90%
Letters of recommendation in specialty	81%	84%
Personal statement	77%	78%
Step 2 CK score	70%	78%
Medical School Performance Evaluation (MSPE/dean's letter)	68%	76%

Between 60% and 75% also mentioned other factors such as core clerkship grades, perceived commitment to specialty, audition elective/rotation within one's department, any failed attempt in USMLE, class ranking/quartile, personal prior knowledge of the applicant, perceived interest in program and passing USMLE Step 2 CS.

These factors often come as a surprise to many students in the preclinical years, who often work very hard to get great grades, but do not realize that only 45% of directors cite basic science performance as an important measure.

Applicants begin the application process with ERAS regardless of their matching program at the beginning of their fourth and final year in medical school.

At this point, students choose specific residency programs to apply for that often specify both specialty and hospital system, sometimes even subtracks (e.g., Internal Medicine Residency Categorical Program at Mass General or San Francisco General Primary Care Track).

===== Interviews =====
The interview process involves separate interviews at hospitals around the country. Frequently, the individual applicant pays for travel and lodging expenses, but some programs may subsidize applicants' expenses.

===== The Match =====
Access to graduate medical training programs such as residencies is a competitive process known as "the Match". After the interview period is over, students submit a "rank-order list" to a centralized matching service that depends on the residency program they are applying for:

- Most specialties: the National Resident Matching Program (NRMP)—the American Osteopathic Association Match used to be a separate option for DOs but was merged with the NRMP Match after 2020
- Urology Residency Match Program
- SF Match—ophthalmology, plastics

Similarly, residency programs submit a list of their preferred applicants in rank order to this same service. The process is blinded, so neither applicant nor program will see each other's list. Aggregate program rankings can be found here, and are tabulated in real time based on applicants' anonymously submitted rank lists.

The two parties' lists are combined by an NRMP computer, which creates stable (a proxy for optimal) matches of residents to programs using an algorithm. On the third Friday of March each year ("Match Day") these results are announced in Match Day ceremonies at the United States' 155 medical schools. By entering the Match system, applicants are contractually obligated to go to the residency program at the institution to which they were matched. The same applies to the programs; they are obligated to take the applicants who matched into them.

===== Supplemental Offer and Acceptance Program =====
The Supplemental Offer and Acceptance Program (SOAP) is a process for partially matched and fully unmatched applicant through the Match. Previous to the creation of SOAP, applicants were given the opportunity to contact the programs about the open positions in a process informally called "the scramble". This frantic, loosely structured system forced soon-to-be medical school graduates to choose within minutes programs not on their original Match list. In 2012, the NRMP introduced the organized system called SOAP. As part of the transition, Match Day was also moved from the third Thursday in March to the third Friday.

The SOAP occurs during Match Week. First the applicants eligible for SOAP, are informed they did not secure a Match position on the Monday of Match Week. The locations of remaining unfilled residency positions are released to the unmatched applicants the following day. Then programs contact applicants for interviews that usually occur via phone calls. After that, programs prepare lists of applicants and the positions open are offered by each program one at a time to the top applicant on their list. The applicant may accept the offer or reject it. If the offer is rejected it will go to the next applicant in the program list during the next round of SOAP. During Match year 2021 there were four rounds of SOAP.

==== Work time restrictions ====
In the US, medical residencies traditionally require lengthy hours of their trainees. Early residents literally resided at the hospitals, often working in unpaid positions during their education. During this time, a resident might always be "on call" or share that duty with just one other physician. The American public, and the medical education establishment, recognized that such long hours were counter-productive, since sleep deprivation increases rates of medical errors. This was noted in a landmark study on the effects of sleep deprivation and error rate in an intensive-care unit. The Accreditation Council for Graduate Medical Education (ACGME) has limited the number of work-hours to 80 hours weekly (averaged over 4 weeks), overnight call frequency to no more than one overnight every third day, and 10 hours off between shifts. Still, a review committee may grant exceptions for up to 10%, or a maximum of 88 hours, to individual programs. Until early 2017, duty periods for postgraduate year 1 could not exceed 16 hours per day, while postgraduate year 2 residents and those in subsequent years can have up to a maximum of 24 hours of continuous duty. After early 2017, all years of residents may work up to 24-hour shifts. While these limits are voluntary, adherence has been mandated for the purposes of accreditation, though lack of adherence to hour restrictions is not uncommon.

Critics of long residency hours trace the problem to the fact that a resident has no alternatives to positions that are offered, meaning residents must accept all conditions of employment, including very long work hours, and that they must also, in many cases, contend with poor supervision. This process, they contend, reduces the competitive pressures on hospitals, resulting in low salaries and long, unsafe work hours.

Criticisms of limiting the work week include disruptions in continuity of care and limiting training gained through involvement in patient care. Similar concerns have arisen in Europe, where the Working Time Directive limits doctors to 48 hours per week averaged out over a 6-month reference period.

==== Financing residency programs ====
The US Department of Health and Human Services, primarily Medicare, funds the vast majority of residency training in the US. This tax-based financing covers resident salaries and benefits through payments called Direct Medical Education, or DME, payments. Medicare also uses taxes for Indirect Medical Education, or IME payments, a subsidy paid to teaching hospitals that is tied to admissions of Medicare patients in exchange for training resident physicians in certain selected specialties. Overall funding levels, however, have remained frozen over the last ten years, creating a bottleneck in the training of new physicians in the US, according to the AMA. On the other hand, some argue that Medicare subsidies for training residents simply provide surplus revenue for hospitals, which recoup their training costs by paying residents salaries that are far below the residents' market value. Nicholson concludes that residency bottlenecks are not caused by a Medicare funding cap, but rather by Residency Review Committees (which approve new residencies in each specialty), which seek to limit the number of specialists in their field to maintain high incomes. In any case, hospitals trained residents long before Medicare provided additional subsidies for that purpose. A large number of teaching hospitals fund resident training to increase the supply of residency slots, leading to the modest 4% total growth in slots from 1998 to 2004.

==== Residency salary ====
===== Resident compensation =====
Starting from the first year of postgraduate training residents trained in the US receive compensation. According to the Medscape Residents Salary & Debt Report, in 2021 the average resident annual salary was US$64,000. In 2021, 43% of trainees polled were satisfied with their compensation according to Medcape's report.

===== Low hourly pay =====
Resident salaries are relatively low compared to those of other healthcare workers, especially when considering hourly compensation. According to the American Medical Association, on average, residents earned approximately US$15 to US$20 per hour, when converting their salaries against an 80-hour work week in 2020.

== Following a successful residency ==
In Australia and New Zealand, it leads to eligibility for fellowship of the Royal Australasian College of Physicians, the Royal Australasian College of Surgeons, or a number of similar bodies.

In Canada, once medical doctors successfully complete their residency program, they become eligible for certification by the Royal College of Physicians and Surgeons of Canada or the College of Family Physicians of Canada (CFPC) if the residency program was in family medicine. Many universities now offer "enhanced skills" certifications in collaboration with the CFPC, allowing family physicians to receive training in various areas such as emergency medicine, palliative care, maternal and child health care, and hospital medicine. Additionally, successful graduates of the family medicine residency program can apply to the "Clinical Scholar Program" in order to be involved in family medicine research.

In Mexico, after finishing their residency, physicians obtain the degree of "Specialist", which renders them eligible for certification and fellowship, depending on the field of practice.

In Nigeria, physicians are awarded the Fellowship of their respective postgraduate medical college. This fellowship is a prerequisite for recognition as a consultant specialist in Nigeria and many West African countries. Graduates may receive any of the following postgraduate qualifications: 'FMCP', 'FMCS', 'FMCR', 'FMCPath', etc. – conferred by the National Postgraduate Medical College of Nigeria (NPMCN) depending on specialty. 'FWACP' – Fellow of the West African College of Physicians. 'FWACS' – Fellow of the West African College of Surgeons. Following award of fellowship, the Medical and Dental Council of Nigeria (MDCN) formally recognizes the individual as a specialist/consultant. Fellowship holders are eligible for appointment as consultant physicians, surgeons, dentists, or radiologists in teaching hospitals, federal medical centers, and tertiary institutions. They may also teach in universities and residency training programs or set up specialist private practices. Some specialties (e.g., Cardiology, Gastroenterology, Paediatric Surgery, Interventional Radiology) offer post-fellowship subspecialty training within or outside Nigeria. Increasingly, Nigerian-trained fellows pursue international fellowships or enroll in academic doctorate (PhD) programs, especially in research-intensive disciplines. The FWACP and FWACS are widely recognized across Anglophone West Africa. NPMCN and WACP/WACS fellowships are increasingly acknowledged in Europe, North America, and the Middle East, although individual recognition often requires equivalence assessments or registration with local medical councils (e.g., GMC in the UK). Many Nigerian-trained specialists have transitioned into international academic, clinical, or humanitarian roles, especially in underserved or diaspora communities.

In South Africa, successful completion of residency leads to board certification as a specialist with the Health Professions Council and eligibility for fellowship of the Colleges of Medicine of South Africa.

In the United States, it leads to eligibility for board certification and membership/fellowship of several specialty colleges and academies.

== See also ==
- Attending physician
- Fellowship (medicine)
- International medical graduate
- Internship (medicine)
- Medical resident work hours
- William Osler
- Post graduate year annotation (PGY)
- Physician training
- Dermatology
- Postdoctoral researcher
- Validation of foreign studies and degrees
