= Sanitation harvest =

Cutting tree parts to stop disease spread

In forestry and silviculture, a sanitation harvest or sanitation cutting is a harvest of trees for the purpose of removing insects or diseases from a stand of trees. Sanitation harvesting is used to prevent the diseases or pests from spreading to other nearby trees. It is a form of intermediate management and is used in order to improve an already existing stand of trees.

== See also ==
- Forest pathology
- Salvage logging
- Silviculture
