= Salvage sales =

In the United States, salvage sales are timber sales from national forests primarily to remove dead, infested, damaged, or down trees and associated trees for stand improvement. They are controversial partly because there are no standards for the number or proportion of trees that must be dead, infested, damaged, or down and partly because the U.S. Forest Service may retain the revenues to prepare and administer future salvage sales.
