= Matching markets =

Field of market economics

In economics, matching markets are markets in which there are two groups of people and/or objects, where each person from one group wants to be matched to a person/object from the other group. Different people in each group may have different preferences regarding who they want to match in the other group; hence the theory is often called matching under preferences.

The theory of matching markets aims to design rules and algorithms for computing matchings that satisfy some desirable normative properties. The most important such property is stability.

In 2012, the Nobel Memorial Prize in Economic Sciences was awarded to Alvin E. Roth and Lloyd Shapley for their work on matching markets, particularly "the theory of stable allocations and the practice of market design".

Matching markets are broadly divided into two main categories: markets with and without money. Markets with money are often said to have *transferrable utility* (TU), as money can be used to transfer utility from one agent to another. Similarly, markets without money are said to have *non-transferrable utility* (NTU).

== Matching markets without money (NTU) ==
This strand of the literature emerged from the Gale and Shapley (1962) introduction of the Gale–Shapley algorithm. Problems studied in this strand include:

- Stable marriage problem - a one-to-one matching between agents of two disjoint groups, each of whom has strict preferences over agents of the other group, so the preferences form a bipartite graph. The typical example is men and women, as in the campus Marriage Pact.
- Hospitals-residents problem - a one-to-many matching between agents of two disjoint groups. The typical example is matching medical school graduates for internships in hospitals, as in the National Resident Matching Program.
- Stable matching with indifference - a generalization of the stable marriage problem, where agents on each group may be indifferent between two or more agents of the other group.
- Stable roommates problem - a one-to-one matching between agents of a single group. This is a generalization of stable marriage, as the preferences form a general graph.
- Pareto optimal matchings;
- Popular matchings;
- Rank-maximal matching and generous matching.

== Matching markets with money (TU) ==
This strand dates back to work on Monge (1781) and Kantorovich (1942) work on optimal transportation theory, in particular following Koopmans and Beckmann (1957) who studies the problem with pricing. Modern TU matching follows work by Shapley and Shubik (1971), who provided a TU equivalent of Gale and Shapley (1962), as well as Becker (1973) who applied TU matching to the marriage market.

== Related theories ==
Walrasian markets are markets with people and commodities, where people buy and sell commodities, and have different preferences regarding various bundles of commodities, but do not match with other people. In contrast, the theory of matching markets focuses of who matches with whom.

Search-and-matching theory is a descriptive theory describing the decentralized formation of matches when there are search frictions (the search is costly). In contrast, matching markets theory usually considers normative (desirable) properties of matchings, and centralized rules that guarantee such properties. Under certain contexts, the search and matching equilibrium converges to a stable matching when search frictions disappear.

== Applications ==
Matching theory typically focuses on two-sided matching, where two types of workers are considered (e.g. men and women in the marriage market, firms and workers in the labor market, and students matching with colleges). A smaller literature considers other types of matching, such as one-sided matching (e.g. the stable roommates problem) and many-sided matching (e.g. man-woman-child matching). Within two sided matching, three types of matches are considered: one-to-one, many-to-one, and many-to-many.

Matching theory has been applied to study a wide set of applications, including: marriage, housing allocation, kidney exchange, the National Resident Matching Program, school choice, and hedging strategies in options financial markets.
