= Popular matching =

Theory in matching markets

In the theory of matching markets, a popular matching is a matching that at least half of the agents prefer over any other matching. In other words, it is a (weak) Condorcet winner in the elections where the candidates are all possible matchings. The notion was invented in 1975 by Peter Gardenfors.

== Popularity vs. stability ==
A stable matching is a matching that is not "blocked" by any pair of agents. That is, no two agents prefer to be matched to each other than to be matched to their present partners.

Every stable matching is popular. This is because, for every other matching, in every pair of matched agents, at least one member of the pair prefers the original matching. But the opposite is not true: there may be popular matchings that are not stable. As an example, suppose there are two men: David and Palti, and two women: Michal and Abigail. The preferences are:

- David prefers Michal to Abigail;
- Palti can only be matched to Michal.
- Michal prefers David to Palti;
- Abigail can only be matched to David.

The only stable matching is David-Michal, as in any other matching, David and Michal form a blocking pair. Note that the size of this matching is 1, as Abigail and Palti cannot be matched to each other.

The matching David-Abigail and Michal-Palti is not stable, but it is "popular". Specifically, in the vote between the stable matching (David-Michal) and the non-stable matching, two agents (namely David and Michal) vote for the stable matching, and the other two agents vote for the non-stable matching. So both matchings are popular, but only one of them is stable.

== Popularity and matching size ==
The above example shows that relaxing the requirement of stability to popularity might enable larger matching, which is an important requirement in many applications. In fact, in two-sided matching markets:

- Stable matchings have the smallest size among all popular matchings.
- There always exists a popular matching with size at least 2/3 of the maximum cardinality matching, and this is tight.
- There always exists a popular matching with size at least 1/2 of the maximum cardinality matching, and this is tight, as shown by the above example.

== Popular max-matching ==
In some cases, it is required to have a matching of maximum cardinality. Hence, it makes sense to compute the popularity of a matching only among the set of maximum-cardinality matching. A popular max-matching is a (weak) Condorcet winner among the maximum-cardinality matching.

In two-sided matching markets, a popular max-matching always exists, and can be found in time O(n m), where n is the number of agents and m the number of edges. The algorithm is a variant of the Gale–Shapley algorithm and it is called "|A|-level Gale-Shapley". It is equivalent to finding a stable matching in an auxiliary instance.

== Quasi-popular matching ==
A quasi-popular matching is a matching with "unpopularity factor" of at most 2, that is, the number of agents who weakly prefer it to another matching is at least half the number of agents who prefer the other matching.

== Popularity vs. Pareto-efficiency ==
Every popular matching is Pareto-efficient, as if there were a Pareto improvement, at least one agent would vote only for the Pareto improvement, whereas the others would vote for both.

Hence, popularity is between stability and efficiency:

Stable → Popular → Efficient

== Optimal popular matchings: two-sided markets ==
In some cases, each pairing between a man and a woman has a cost, and it is required to find a popular matching of minimum total cost (this problem is analogous to the problem of optimal stable matching, where the goal is to find a stable matching of miniumum cost). The following holds in two-sided matching markets:

- Finding a maximum-cardinality matching among all popular matchings can be done in polytime.
- Finding a min-cost popular matching is NP-hard.
- Finding a min-cost popular max-matching can be done in polynomial time. The algorithm uses a compact representation of the polytope of popular max-matchings.
- Finding a min-cost Parete-efficient max-matching in NP-hard, and hard to approximate to any constant factor. This holds even when all edge costs are in {0,1} and all rankings are strict.
- Finding a min-cost quasi-popular matching is NP-hard.In contrast, in a general (non-bipartite) graph, even when a stable matching exists, computing a maximum-cardinality popular matching is NP-hard.

== Optimal popular matchings: one-sided markets ==
Popular matchings were also studied in one-sided matching markets, where only agents in one side of the market have preferences, as in the house allocation problem and the fair random assignment problem. In such markets:

- Finding a min-cost popular matching can be done in polynomial time.
- A popular max-matching does not always exist. Existence can be decided in polynomial time.
- Finding a min-cost popular max-matching is NP-hard.

So the situation in one-sided markets is the opposite of the situation in two-sided markets:

	One-sided markets	Two-sided markets
Min-cost popular matching	P	NP-hard
Min-cost popular max-matching	NP-hard	P

== Popular many-to-many matchings ==
Brandl and Kavitha study popular many-to-many matchings. They prove that, with bipartite preferences, every pairwise-stable matching is popular, and a maximum-cardinality popular matching can be computed in linear time by an extension of Gale–Shapley algorithm.

== Additional reading ==
- A survey paper on computational aspects of popular matchings.
