= Marriage Pact =

Matchmaking activity on U.S. college campuses

- Founded: 2017; 9 years ago
- Area served: United States
- Founders: Liam McGregor; Sophia Sterling-Angus
- Industry: Matchmaking
- Website: marriagepact.com

The Marriage Pact is an annual matchmaking activity that takes place on American college campuses, by which students fill out compatibility surveys in order to find a partner among fellow participants, who they agree will be their backup "safety" spouse in the future in case they are then unmarried.

== Background ==
Agreements between young friends to marry later in life are a trope of American entertainment, popularized in the film My Best Friend's Wedding, that also occur occasionally in life.

The stable marriage problem, and human matching more generally, is a problem of allocation. Unlike marketplaces, where problems are solved by establishing pricing mechanisms and then allowing the participants to find optimal solutions among themselves, allocation problems happen when pricing is impractical or undesirable, such as assigning donated organs to surgery patients, students to schools, or refugees to host cities.

In 1962, David Gale and Lloyd Shapley proved that one or more solutions could always be found for an equal number of men and women under idealized assumptions that people's preferences are known, stable, rankable, they are honest about them, and couples are binary and will remain indefinitely in committed heterosexual marriages. However, as real-life dating services have found, these assumptions do not hold. Further, with large populations such as students on a college campus, it would be impractical for each participant to fully rank each other participant in order of preference. As a result, preferences must be inferred in one way or another rather than self-reported.

== History ==
In 2017, two Stanford University undergraduate students, Liam McGregor and Sophia Sterling-Angus, decided to study the phenomenon as a final project for Economics 136, an economics class in market design taught that year by Paul Milgrom, who would later receive a Nobel Prize in economics for his contributions to auction designs.

Although tasked with writing an essay about market design, McGregor and Sterling-Angus instead pitched to Milgrom the idea of implementing an online solution to the stable marriage problem, which is to pair as many individuals as possible within a population such that none of the paired individuals would prefer to leave their partner in favor of a new partner who would similarly wish to leave their current partner for them.

McGregor and Sterling-Angus decided to rank compatibility by having students complete a survey. Asked to suggest some questions, McGregor's mother suggested that the questions should be about values rather than the typical dating questions about preferences about looks or money. Among the questions they chose were whether participants would keep a gun in their house, or whether they consider their friends to be quiet.

To enroll participants, Sterling-Angus coined the name "The Stanford Marriage Pact" and created a flyer to promote the project. The flyer quickly went viral by text on campus. Within four days, 3,400 students had enrolled, and by the time the initial matching was done, 58% of the student body had signed up.

The project soon spread to other campuses in subsequent years, and McGregor launched a company to work full-time to support it. In 2020, a number of college administrations, including those at Vanderbilt and Tufts, sponsored the project as a way of diverting students during the COVID-19 pandemic. National Public Radio commented that it could potentially become a standard part of college life, and as of December 2025, it is available on 109 college campuses.
