= School-choice mechanism =

School admissions algorithm

A school-choice mechanism is an algorithm that aims to match pupils to schools in a way that respects both the pupils' preferences and the schools' priorities. It is used to automate the process of school choice. The most common school-choice mechanisms are variants of the deferred-acceptance algorithm and random serial dictatorship.

== Relation to other matching mechanisms ==
School choice is a kind of a two-sided matching market, like the stable marriage problem or residency matching. The main difference is that, in school choice, one side of the market (namely, the schools) are not strategic. Their priorities do not represent subjective preferences, but are determined by legal requirements, for example: a priority for relatives of previous students, minority quotas, minimum income quotas, etc.

== Strategic considerations ==
A major concern in designing a school-choice mechanism is that it should be strategyproof for the pupils (as they are considered to be strategic), so that they reveal their true preferences for schools. Therefore, the mechanism most commonly used in practice is the Deferred-acceptance algorithm with pupils as the proposers. However, this mechanism may yield outcomes that are not Pareto-efficient for the pupils. This loss of efficiency might be substantial: a recent survey showed that around 2% of the pupils could receive a school that is more preferred by them, without harming any other student. Moreover, in some cases, DA might assign each pupil to their second-worst or worst school.

== Efficiency-adjusted deferred-acceptance ==
Onur Kesten suggested to amend DA by removing "interrupters", that is, (student, school) pairs in which the student proposes to the school, causes the school to reject another student, and rejected later on. This "Efficiency Adjusted Deferred Acceptance" algorithm (EADA) is Pareto-efficient. Whereas it is not stable and not strategyproof for the pupils, it satisfies weaker versions of these two properties. For example, it is regret-free truth-telling.

Interestingly, in lab experiments, more pupils report their true preferences to EADA than to DA (70% vs 35%). EADA is about to be used in Flanders.
