= Assignment Interactive Module 2.0 =

U.S. Army web-based talent management platform

Assignment Interactive Module 2.0 (AIM 2.0) is a web-based talent management system used by the United States Army to manage officer assignments and enable a decentralized, preference-driven marketplace for matching personnel to unit vacancies. Developed as the technological foundation of the Army Talent Alignment Process (ATAP), AIM 2.0 allows officers and units to express mutual preferences, enhancing transparency, career ownership, and alignment between individual capabilities and Army readiness needs.

== Overview ==
AIM 2.0 is used by more than 90,000 active-duty Army officers and warrant officers to build resumes, explore assignment opportunities, and interact directly with units during biannual ATAP marketplace cycles. The platform replaces earlier assignment systems that relied on centralized decision-making by personnel managers at Human Resources Command (HRC).

Unlike legacy processes, AIM 2.0 supports a bidirectional marketplace in which officers and units rank each other’s preferences. These preferences, along with Army readiness requirements, feed into the Army Talent Alignment Algorithm, which generates recommended matches.

== Functionality ==
AIM 2.0 offers officers tools to:

- Create and maintain detailed digital résumés
- Indicate assignment preferences based on location, family needs, and career development
- Communicate directly with units posting open positions

Units can:

- Post detailed descriptions for every vacant billet
- Filter candidates based on specific Knowledge, Skills, and Behaviors (KSBs)
- Rank officers based on preference and interview interaction

The platform emphasizes four operational principles: thickness, speed, intelligence, and transparency.

- Thickness refers to the availability of sufficient positions and candidates to produce strong matches.
- Speed ensures officers and units can navigate large datasets efficiently.
- Intelligence integrates business rules and algorithms to support fair and incentive-compatible matching.
- Transparency enables participants to view preferences, position details, and matching logic.

== Marketplace Process ==
The assignment process via AIM 2.0 occurs in three structured phases as part of the ATAP marketplace:

- Phase I – Set the Market: Units validate position vacancies and enter job descriptions into AIM 2.0. Officers scheduled to move update their résumés.
- Phase II – Market Execution: Officers and units interact through the platform, conduct interviews, and rank preferences.
- Phase III – Match and Clear the Market: The Army Talent Alignment Algorithm processes preferences and constraints to generate proposed matches. Remaining vacancies are filled manually by HRC, incorporating expressed preferences where possible.

== Algorithm ==
The platform’s matching engine is based on a Nobel Prize-winning preference-matching model derived from the Gale–Shapley algorithm. This model seeks to optimize assignment satisfaction while maintaining fairness, readiness, and policy constraints.

== Reception and Impact ==
AIM 2.0 has been broadly welcomed by officers and commanders, especially for increasing agency in the assignment process and enabling unit-level hiring input for the first time. Officers are more likely to receive preferred assignments when they actively engage in résumé building and communication with units.

However, participants have identified usability and timeline challenges. Recommendations from users include:

- Improved visualization of preference matches
- Additional market timeline checkpoints
- Better mutual visibility of ranking data

== Strategic Importance ==
AIM 2.0 supports the Army’s broader shift toward data-driven, talent-focused human capital management. It complements initiatives like the Integrated Personnel and Pay System – Army (IPPS-A) and reflects a move from strength-based to talent-based officer management.

== See also ==
- Army Talent Alignment Process
- Gale–Shapley algorithm
- Integrated Personnel and Pay System – Army
- Talent management
- Human resources management
