= School choice =

Term for pre-college public education options

School choice is a term for education options that allow students and families to select alternatives to traditional public schools. It is the subject of fierce debate in various state legislatures across the United States.

School choice options include scholarship tax credit programs, open enrollment laws (which allow students to attend public schools other than their neighborhood school), charter schools, magnet schools, virtual schools, homeschooling, education savings accounts (ESAs), and individual education tax credits or deductions.

== Forms ==
=== Scholarship tax credits ===
In the United States, Scholarship tax credit programs grant individuals and businesses a full or partial credit toward their taxes for donations made to scholarship granting organizations (SGOs; also called school tuition organizations). SGOs use the donations to create scholarships that allow students to attend private schools or out-of-district public schools. These programs currently exist in fourteen states: Alabama, Arizona, Florida, Georgia, Illinois, Iowa, Kansas, Louisiana, Minnesota, New Hampshire, Oklahoma, Pennsylvania, Rhode Island, and Virginia.

=== Vouchers ===
Vouchers help pay for private school tuition, whether secular or religious, and depending on jurisdiction for charter schools, home schooling, or public schools.

=== Charter schools ===
Charter schools are independent public schools that are exempt from many of the regulations governing public schools. These exemptions grant charter schools some autonomy and flexibility with decision-making, such as teacher contracts, hiring, and curriculum. In return, charter schools are subject to stricter accountability on spending and academic performance. Most states and the national capital of Washington, D.C. have charter school laws, though they vary in how charter schools are approved.

=== Magnet schools ===
Magnet schools are public schools that specialize in science, technology, art or other specific areas. Magnet schools are not open to all children; some require a competitive examination. Magnet schools are an example of open enrollment programs, which refer to those that allow families to choose public schools other than the ones they are assigned.

=== Homeschooling ===
Home education or homeschooling is education provided at home, provided primarily by a parent or under direct parental control. Informal home education predates public schools, and formal instruction in the home has at times been popular. As public education grew during the 1900s, homeschooling dropped. Since 2000, the number of children educated at home has increased, particularly in the US. Laws relevant to home education differ: in some states, the parent needs to notify the state that the child is to be educated at home, while in others, at least one parent must be a certified teacher and annual progress reports are reviewed by the state.

=== Inter-district enrollment ===
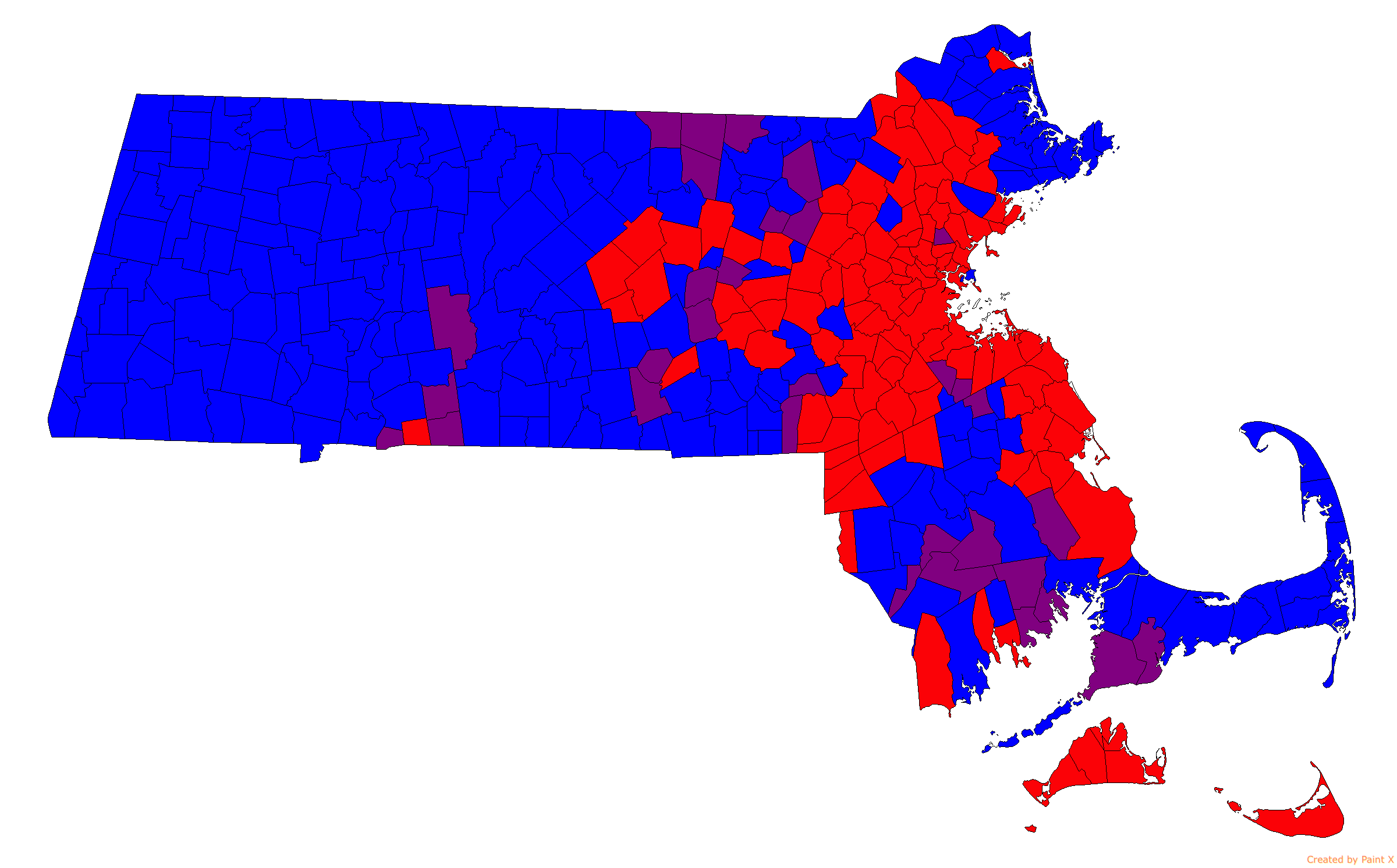
The Commonwealth of Massachusetts allows the school committees of public school districts to have open enrollment policies. Towns in Massachusetts represented by the "School Choice Receiving District Status" (open enrollment status) of their public high school district for the 2016–2017 academic year. Towns represented in blue have school districts with an open enrollment policy for kindergarten through high school. Towns represented in purple have school districts with open enrollment only for specific grades. Towns represented in red have school districts with a closed enrollment policy.

Intra-district open enrollment programs allow school choice within a district, while inter-district open enrollment allows families to choose schools outside the district.

To participate in California's District of Choice program, district governing boards declare themselves a District of Choice and set a quota for how many students to accept. School districts cannot discriminate among students, but can limit the number through a lottery system.

=== Education savings accounts ===
ESAs allow parents to receive public funds in a government-authorized savings account. These funds are often distributed in the form of a debit card that can be used to pay for various services, such as private school tuition and fees, online programs, private tutoring, community college costs, higher education services, and other approved learning materials and services. ESAs can pay for a combination of public school courses and private services.

=== Tax credit/deduction ===
Some states allow parents to claim a tax credit or deduction to help fund certain educational expenses. These can include private school tuition, textbooks, school supplies and equipment, tutoring, and transportation.

Some other jurisdictions reduce the income tax for parents, so educational expenses can be more economical, which include private school tuition, supplies, computers, books, tutors, and transportation.

=== Online learning ===
Online learning allows students to work with teachers and their courses over the internet.

=== Composites ===
Course choice programs, public school courses, and special education therapies can be integrated into a student's curriculum, potentially with hybrid funding.

== By country ==
=== Belgium ===
The Flemish community of Belgium has a high-performing education system as measured by PISA scores. Most private schools are subject to government targets and inspections. Schools are not allowed to select students via admissions tests, performance, religious background, or gender. The Flemish education system allows choice between teaching styles and competition, while suffering from relatively high socio-economic segregation.

=== Chile ===
In Chile, researchers reported that when controlling for student background (parental income and education), the difference in performance between public and private sectors is not significant. Variation within each sector is greater than that between the two systems.

=== Sweden ===
Sweden's system of school choice is one of the world's freest, providing public funds for student choice of publicly or privately run school, including religious and for-profit schools. Fifteen years after the 1993 reform, private school enrollment had increased from 1% to 10% of the student population.

=== United States ===
The first use of school vouchers in the United States dated back to state tuition grants provided by Virginia's 1956 Stanley Plan, which financed white-only private schools known as segregation academies. Other states followed until the practice was disallowed by Griffin v. County School Board of Prince Edward County (1964).

School choice is the subject of fierce debate in various state legislatures across the United States. The most common type of school choice in the United States, measured both by the number of programs and by the number of participating students, are scholarship tax credit programs. These allow individuals or corporations to receive tax credits toward their state taxes in exchange for donations made to non-profit organizations that grant private school scholarships. A similar subsidy may be provided by a state through a school voucher program.

== Benefits ==
=== Parental influence ===
School choice gives parents more influence over what students learn (e.g., academics vs trades) and the learning environment (e.g., discipline, uniforms, extra-curriculars).

=== Student achievement ===
Caroline Hoxby suggested that competition among schools increases student achievement. Supporters say this would level the playing field by broadening opportunities for low-income students—particularly minorities—to attend high-quality schools that would otherwise be accessible only to higher-income families.

In a 2026 study, researchers found private schools benefit the most from enrolling high achieving students. Those students have academic abilities that positively influence their classmates. In conclusion, researchers found private schools aren’t more effective than an average public schools, it’s the peers that make the learning environment successful.

=== Competition ===
Voucher supporters argue that choice creates competition between schools, and that failing schools can lose students and close. Competition encourages schools to create innovative programs, become more responsive to parental demands, and increase student achievement. Competition can help parents influence their child's education. Parents can also punish ineffective schools by transferring their children elsewhere. Traditional public schools also have to compete, although even the least effective are rarely closed.

=== Cost effectiveness ===
Studies undertaken by the Cato Institute and other American libertarian and conservative think tanks claim that privately run education costs less and produces superior outcomes.

=== Mental health ===
One study reported that states that adopted charter school laws experienced a decline in adolescent suicides, and that private schooling reduces the likelihood of adults reporting mental health issues. School choice supporters claim that it can reduce bullying since families could choose to send their kids to a different school if they are experiencing bullying.

=== Rights ===
According to the Organisation Internationale pour le Droit à l'Education et la Liberté d'Enseignement (Note: English: International Organization for the Right to Education and Freedom of Education) (OIDEL), the right to education is a human right and parents should be able to choose a school for their children without discrimination on the basis of finances. To advance freedom of education, OIDEL promotes a greater parity between public and private schooling systems.

=== Housing prices ===
One study reported that school choice programs in Seoul, South Korea, reduced housing prices in high-performing districts more than in low-performing districts.

== Criticism ==
=== Profiteering ===
School choice measures are criticized as encouraging profiteering. Charter authorization organizations have non-profit status; and contract with related for-profit entities. Charters have been accused of creating units that charge them high rent, and that while the facilities are used as schools, they pay no property taxes.

Even with vouchers and other financial assistance to parents, opponents of school choice believe that K–12 education should not be a cost item in the for-profit sector. As public school advocate Diane Ravitch wrote, "Free public education—open to all and democratically controlled—is one of the pillars of our democracy."

=== Constitutionality ===
Some school choice measures are criticized as violating church-state separation. The constitutionality of state-sponsored school choice laws has been challenged by school board associations, public school districts, teacher unions, associations of school business officials, the American Civil Liberties Union, the Freedom From Religion Foundation, and People for the American Way.

=== Destruction of the public system ===
School choice has been criticized for aiming to privatize public education, and in the process, weaken teachers' unions. When defending those unions, Diane Ravitch wrote, "The great appeal of charter schools to entrepreneurs and Wall Street is that more than 90% of them are non-union."

=== Racism ===
School choice policies have been accused of racism, as they came into prominence shortly after the 1954 Brown v. Board of Education decision required desegregation of public schools. A consequence of the landmark decision was "a frantic search among white elected officials in the South to find, or create, a legal mechanism through which to protect racial segregation." In Milton Friedman's 1955 essay about school choice, "Southern governors and legislators found the rationale and language they sought" for allowing white parents to not be compelled to send their child to the neighborhood school.

== See also ==
- School-choice mechanism: an algorithm for matching pupils to schools in a way that respects the pupils' preferences and the schools' priorities.
- Tax choice
