= David Gale =

American mathematician (1921–2008)

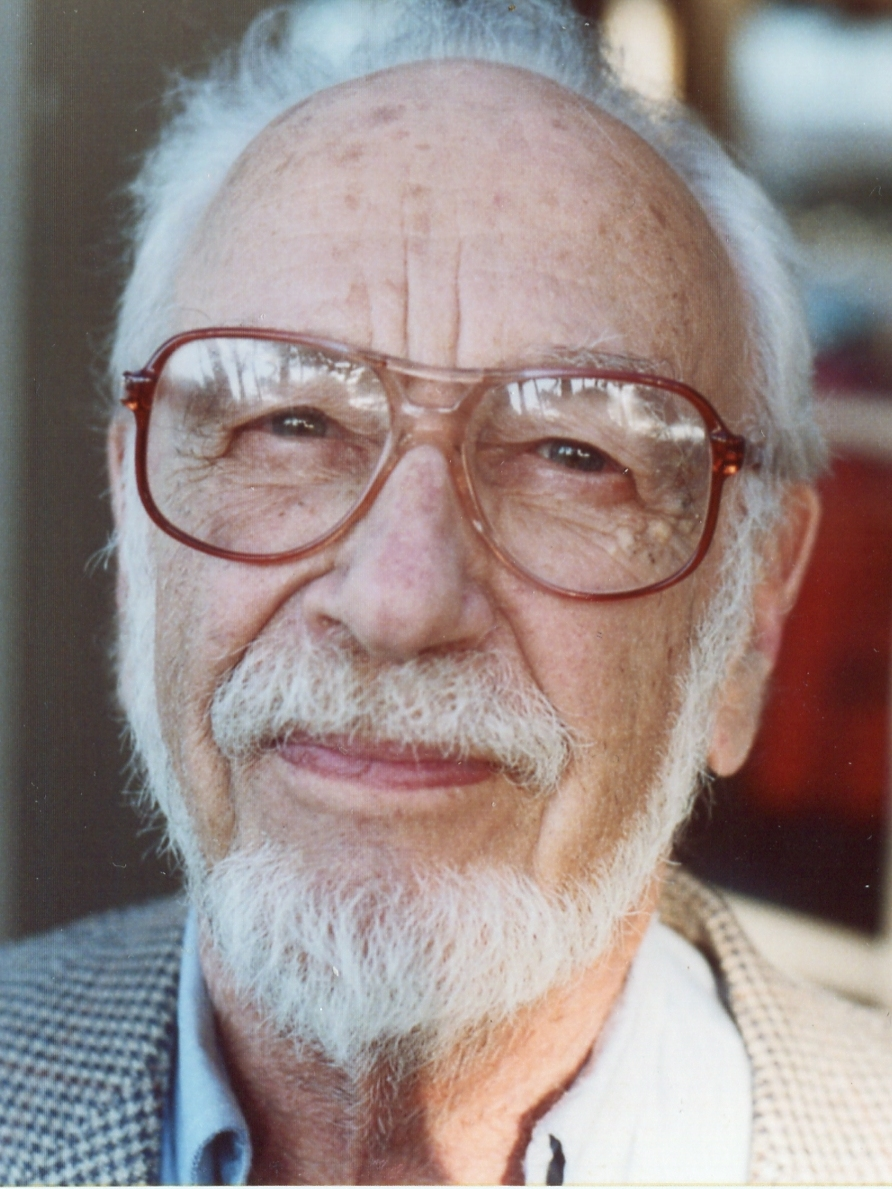
- Born: December 13, 1921; New York City, New York, U.S.
- Died: March 7, 2008 (aged 86); Berkeley, California, U.S.
- Education: Swarthmore College (BA); University of Michigan (MA); Princeton University (PhD)
- Known for: Gale transform linear programming convex analysis Chomp; Bridg-It; Gale–Shapley algorithm Ramsey problem
- Awards: John von Neumann Theory Prize (1980); Golden Goose Award (2013); Pirelli Internetional Award
- Scientific career
- Fields: Mathematical economics
- Workplaces: University of California, Berkeley, 1966–2008; Brown University, 1950–65; Rand Corporation, 1957–58; Princeton University 1949–50
- Thesis: Solutions of Finite Two-Person Games (1949)
- Doctoral advisor: Albert W. Tucker
- Doctoral students: William A. Brock; Hal Varian

David Gale (December 13, 1921 – March 7, 2008) was an American mathematician and economist. He was a professor emeritus at the University of California, Berkeley, affiliated with the departments of mathematics, economics, and industrial engineering and operations research. He has contributed to the fields of mathematical economics, game theory, and convex analysis.

== Personal life ==
Gale graduated with a Bachelor of Arts from Swarthmore College, obtained a M.A. from the University of Michigan in 1947, and earned his Ph.D. in mathematics at Princeton University in 1949. He taught at Brown University from 1950 to 1965 and then joined the faculty at the University of California, Berkeley.

Gale lived in Berkeley, California, and Paris, France, with his partner Sandra Gilbert, feminist literary scholar and poet. He has three daughters and two grandsons. He died on March 7, 2008 of a heart attack at the age of 86.

== Contributions ==
Gale's contributions to mathematical economics include an early proof of the existence of competitive equilibrium, his solution of the n-dimensional Ramsey problem, in the theory of optimal economic growth.

Gale and F. M. Stewart initiated the study of infinite games with perfect information. This work led to fundamental contributions to mathematical logic.

Gale is the inventor of the game of Bridg-It (also known as "Game of Gale") and Chomp.

Gale played a fundamental role in the development of the theory of linear programming and linear inequalities. His classic 1960 book The Theory of Linear Economic Models continues to be a standard reference for this area.

The Gale transform is an involution on sets of points in projective space. The concept is important in optimization, coding theory, and algebraic geometry.

Gale's 1962 paper with Lloyd Shapley on the stable marriage problem provides the first formal statement and proof of a problem that has far-reaching implications in many matching markets. The resulting Gale–Shapley algorithm is currently being applied in New York and Boston public school systems in assigning students to schools. In 2012 The Nobel Prize in Economics was awarded to Shapley for this work.

Gale wrote a Mathematical Entertainments column for The Mathematical Intelligencer from 1991 through 1997. The book Tracking the Automatic Ant collects these columns.

In 2004 Gale developed MathSite, a pedagogic website that uses interactive exhibits to illustrate important mathematical ideas. MathSite won the 2007 Pirelli Internetional Award for Science Communication in Mathematics.

== Awards and honors ==
- Procter Fellow, Princeton University, 1948
- Fulbright Research Fellowship, 1953–54
- Guggenheim Fellow, 1962–63, 1981
- Fellow, Econometric Society, 1965
- Miller Professor, 1971–72
- Fellow, Center for Advanced Study in Behavioral Sciences, 1975–76
- Fellow, American Academy of Arts and Sciences, 1978
- Lester Ford Prize, 1979–80
- John von Neumann Theory Prize, 1980
- Member, National Academy of Sciences, 1983
- 2002 class of Fellows of the Institute for Operations Research and the Management Sciences
- Pirelli Internetional Award Science Communication of Mathematics, 2007
- Golden Goose Award, 2013

== Selected publications ==
- Infinite games with perfect information (with F.M. Stewart). Annals of Mathematics 28 (1953), pp. 245–266.
- The law of supply and demand. Mathematica Scandinavica 3 (1955), pp. 33–44.
- Neighboring vertices on a convex polyhedron, in “Linear Inequalities and Related Systems” (H.W. Kuhn and A.W. Tucker, eds.), Annals of Mathematics Studies 38, 255–263, Princeton Univ. Press, 1956.
- The theory of linear economic models. McGraw-Hill, New York, 1960.
- College admissions and the stability of marriage (with L.S. Shapley). American Mathematical Monthly 69 (1962), pp. 9–15.
- A note on global instability of competitive equilibrium. Naval Research Logistics Quarterly 10 (1963), pp. 81–87.
- The Jacobian matrix and global univalence of mappings (with H. Nikaido). Mathematische Annalen 2 (1965), pp. 81–93.
- On optimal development in a multi-sector economy. The Review of Economic Studies 34 (1967), pp. 1–18.
- Pure exchange equilibrium of dynamic economic models. Journal of Economic Theory 6 (1973), pp. 12–26.
- A curious nim-type game. American Mathematical Monthly 81(1974), pp. 876–879.
- The game of Hex and the Brouwer fixed-point theorem. American Mathematical Monthly 86(1979), pp. 818–827.
- The strategy structure of two-sided matching markets (with G. Demange). Econometrica 53, no. 4 (1985), pp. 873–888.
- Tracking the automatic ant. And other mathematical explorations. A collection of Mathematical Entertainments columns from The Mathematical Intelligencer. Springer-Verlag, New York, 1998, pp. xii + 241.

== See also ==
- Gale diagram
- Gale evenness condition

== Notes ==
- Citation of von Neumann Theory Prize on David Gale’s work
- "Mathematician, puzzle lover David Gale has died".
- Pearce, Jeremy (March 31, 2008). "David Gale, Who Created Marriage Algorithm, Is Dead at 86". The New York Times.
