= Stable matching problem =

Pairing where no unchosen pair prefers each other over their choice

In mathematics, economics, and computer science, the stable matching problem is the problem of finding a stable matching between two equally sized sets of elements given an ordering of preferences for each element. A matching is a bijection from the elements of one set to the elements of the other set. A matching is not stable if:

1. There is an element A of the first matched set which prefers some given element B of the second matched set over the element to which A is already matched, and
2. B also prefers A over the element to which B is already matched.

In other words, a matching is stable when there does not exist any pair (A, B) where both prefer each other to their current partner under the matching.

The problem has been stated as a stable marriage problem:

Given n men and n women, where each person has ranked all members of the opposite sex in order of preference, marry the men and women to each other such that there are no two people of opposite sex who would both rather have each other than their current partners. When there are no such pairs of people, the set of marriages is deemed stable.

The existence of two classes that need to be paired with each other (heterosexual men and women in this example) distinguishes this problem from the stable roommates problem.

== Applications ==
Algorithms for finding solutions to the stable matching problem have applications in a variety of real-world situations, perhaps the best known of these being in the assignment of graduating medical students to their first hospital appointments. In 2012, the Nobel Memorial Prize in Economic Sciences was awarded to Lloyd S. Shapley and Alvin E. Roth "for the theory of stable allocations and the practice of market design."

An extension of the Gale-Shapley algorithm has been used in content delivery networks. Optimizing performance from a user's point of view and balancing server load requires a good matching of clusters of users accessing a given type of content (e.g. web pages or video) with clusters of servers well-positioned to serve them the desired content. This can be modeled as user clusters and server clusters having (partial) preferences over each other based on variables such as network topology or contractual agreements with internet service providers. This can then be solved as a stable matching problem. A generalization of the classic Gale-Shapley approach is necessary because there are unequal numbers of clusters on each side, because demand and capacity can vary between clusters, and because the preferences are partial instead of total.

The Gale–Shapley algorithm for stable matching is used to assign rabbis who graduate from Hebrew Union College to Jewish congregations.

== Different stable matchings ==
In general, there may be many different stable matchings. For example, suppose there are three men (A, B, C) and three women (X, Y, Z) which have preferences of:

A: YXZ B: ZYX C: XZY
X: BAC Y: CBA Z: ACB

There are three stable solutions to this matching arrangement:

- men get their first choice and women their third – (AY, BZ, CX);
- all participants get their second choice – (AX, BY, CZ);
- women get their first choice and men their third – (AZ, BX, CY).

All three are stable, because instability requires both of the participants to be happier with an alternative match. Giving one group their first choices ensures that the matches are stable because they would be unhappy with any other proposed match. Giving everyone their second choice ensures that any other match would be disliked by one of the parties. In general, the family of solutions to any instance of the stable matching problem can be given the structure of a finite distributive lattice, and this structure leads to efficient algorithms for several problems on stable matchings.

In a uniformly-random instance of the stable matching problem with n men and n women, the average number of stable matchings is asymptotically $e^{-1}n\ln n$. In a stable matching instance chosen to maximize the number of different stable matchings, this number is an exponential function of n. Counting the number of stable matchings in a given instance is #P-complete.

== Algorithmic solution ==
Animation showing an example of the Gale–Shapley algorithm

In 1962, David Gale and Lloyd Shapley proved that, for any equal number in different groups, in the context of college admissions and individuals wanting heterosexual marriage it is always possible to solve as matched couples to make all resultant pairings / matched factors stable. They presented an algorithm to do so.

The Gale–Shapley algorithm (also known as the deferred acceptance algorithm) involves a number of "rounds" (or "iterations"):

- In the first round, first a) each unengaged man proposes to the woman he prefers most, and then b) each woman replies "maybe" to her suitor she most prefers and "no" to all other suitors. She is then provisionally "engaged" to the suitor she most prefers so far, and that suitor is likewise provisionally engaged to her.
- In each subsequent round, first a) each unengaged man proposes to the most-preferred woman to whom he has not yet proposed (regardless of whether the woman is already engaged), and then b) each woman replies "maybe" if she is currently not engaged or if she prefers this man over her current provisional partner (in this case, she rejects her current provisional partner who becomes unengaged). The provisional nature of engagements preserves the right of an already-engaged woman to "trade up" (and, in the process, to "jilt" her until-then partner).
- This process is repeated until everyone is engaged.

This algorithm is guaranteed to produce a stable matching for all participants in time $O(n^2)$ where $n$ is the number of men or women.

Among all possible different stable matchings, it always yields the one that is best for all men among all stable matchings, and worst for all women.

It is a truthful mechanism from the point of view of men (the proposing side), i.e., no man can get a better matching for himself by misrepresenting his preferences. Moreover, the GS algorithm is even group-strategy proof for men, i.e., no coalition of men can coordinate a misrepresentation of their preferences such that all men in the coalition are strictly better-off. However, it is possible for some coalition to misrepresent their preferences such that some men are better-off and the other men retain the same partner. The GS algorithm is non-truthful for the women (the reviewing side): each woman may be able to misrepresent her preferences and get a better match.

The Gale–Shapley algorithm also exposes parallelism for accelerating large-scale SMP instances, since unengaged men can make proposals independently in each round. Parallel implementations can assign men to different threads, resolve simultaneous proposals with synchronization primitives, and use optimizations such as queue avoidance, locality-aware data layouts, and hybrid CPU–GPU execution to reduce overhead.

== Rural hospitals theorem ==
The rural hospitals theorem concerns a more general variant of the stable matching problem, like that applying in the problem of matching doctors to positions at hospitals, differing in the following ways from the basic n-to-n form of the stable matching problem:

- Each participant may only be willing to be matched to a subset of the participants on the other side of the matching.
- The participants on one side of the matching (the hospitals) may have a numerical capacity, specifying the number of doctors they are willing to hire.
- The total number of participants on one side might not equal the total capacity to which they are to be matched on the other side.
- The resulting matching might not match all of the participants.

In this case, the condition of stability is that no unmatched pair prefer each other to their situation in the matching (whether that situation is another partner or being unmatched). With this condition, a stable matching will still exist, and can still be found by the Gale–Shapley algorithm.

For this kind of stable matching problem, the rural hospitals theorem states that:

- The set of assigned doctors, and the number of filled positions in each hospital, are the same in all stable matchings.
- Any hospital that has some empty positions in some stable matching, receives exactly the same set of doctors in all stable matchings.

== Related problems ==
In stable matching with indifference, some men might be indifferent between two or more women and vice versa.

The stable roommates problem is similar to the stable matching problem, but differs in that all participants belong to a single pool (instead of being divided into equal numbers of "men" and "women" who are to be paired).

The hospitals/residents problem – also known as the college admissions problem – differs from the stable matching problem in that a hospital can take multiple residents, or a college can take an incoming class of more than one student. Algorithms to solve the hospitals/residents problem can be hospital-oriented (as the NRMP was before 1995) or resident-oriented. This problem was solved, with an algorithm, in the same original paper by Gale and Shapley, in which the stable matching problem was solved.

The hospitals/residents problem with couples allows the set of residents to include couples who must be assigned together, either to the same hospital or to a specific pair of hospitals chosen by the couple (e.g., a married couple want to ensure that they will stay together and not be stuck in programs that are far away from each other). The addition of couples to the hospitals/residents problem renders the problem NP-complete.

The assignment problem seeks to find a matching in a weighted bipartite graph that has maximum weight. Maximum weighted matchings do not have to be stable, but in some applications a maximum weighted matching is better than a stable one.

The matching with contracts problem is a generalization of matching problem, in which participants can be matched with different terms of contracts. An important special case of contracts is matching with flexible wages.

The popular matching problem seeks a matching $M^*$ such that no other matching $M$ exists with more people happier with $M$ than with $M^*$. For non-bipartite inputs, it is NP-complete to determine whether a popular matching exists.

== See also ==
- Matching (graph theory) – matching between different vertices of the graph; usually unrelated to preference-ordering.
- Envy-free matching – a relaxation of stable matching for many-to-one matching problems
- Rainbow matching for edge colored graphs
- Stable matching polytope
- Secretary problem (also called marriage problem) – deciding when to stop to obtain the best reward in a sequence of options
