= Strategic bankruptcy problem =

Problem in mathematical sociology

A strategic bankruptcy problem is a variant of a bankruptcy problem (also called claims problem) in which claimants may act strategically, that is, they may manipulate their claims or their behavior. There are various kinds of strategic bankruptcy problems, differing in the assumptions about the possible ways in which claimants may manipulate.

== Definitions ==
There is a divisible resource, denoted by $E$ (=Estate or Endowment). There are n people who claim this resource or parts of it; they are called claimants. The amount claimed by each claimant i is denoted by $c_i$. Usually, $\sum_{i=1}^n c_i > E$, that is, the estate is insufficient to satisfy all the claims. The goal is to allocate to each claimant an amount $x_i$ such that $\sum_{i=1}^n x_i = E$.

== Unit-selection game ==
O'Neill describes the following game.

- The estate is divided to small units (for example, if all claims are integers, then the estate can be divided into E units of size 1).
- Each claimant i chooses some $c_i$ units.
- Each unit is divided equally among all agents who claim it.

Naturally, the agents would try to choose units such that the overlap between different agents is minimal. This game has a Nash equilibrium. In any Nash equilibrium, there is some integer k such that each unit is claimed by either k or k+1 claimants. When there are two claimants, there is a unique equilibrium payoff vector, and it is identical to the one returned by the contested garment rule.

== Rule-proposal games ==
Several games allow the claimants to suggest a rule, or a parameter in a rule, by which the estate will be divided.

Chun describes the following game.

- Each claimant proposes a division rule.
- The proposed rule must satisfy the property of order-preservation (a claimant with a higher claim must have weakly-higher gain and weakly-higher loss).
- All proposed rules are applied to the problem; each claimant's claim is replaced with the maximum amount awarded to him by a proposed rule.
- The process repeats with the revised claims.

The process converges. Moreover, it has a unique Nash equilibrium, in which the payoffs are equal to the ones prescribed by the constrained equal awards rule.

Herrero describes a dual game, in which, at each round, each claimant's claim is replaced with the minimum amount awarded to him by a proposed rule. This process, too, has a unique Nash equilibrium, in which the payoffs are equal to the ones prescribed by the constrained equal losses rule.

Bouwhuis, Borm and Hendrickx present a game in which each claimant selects a parameter between zero and one, and the estate is divided by the member of the TAL-family corresponding to the mean of the chosen parameters. They prove that Nash equilibria exist for any number of claimants, giving the full set of equilibria for two claimants and, for more claimants, an existence proof based on the notion of a pivotal player; claimants with large claims tend to favor rules closer to constrained equal losses while smaller claimants favor rules closer to constrained equal awards.

== Amount-proposal game ==
Sonn describes the following sequential game.

- Claimant 1 proposes an amount to claimant 2.
- If claimant 2 accepts, he leaves with it and claimant 1 then proposes an amount to claimant 3, etc.
- If a claimant k rejects, then claimant 1 moves to the end of line, the claimant k starts making offerts to the next claimant.
- The offer made to each claimant i must be at most $c_i$, and at most the remaining amount.
- The process continues until one claimant remains; that claimant gets the remaining estate.

Sonn proves that, when the discount factor approaches 1, the limit of payoff vectors of this game converges to the constrained equal awards payoffs.

== Division-proposal games ==
Serrano describes another sequential game of offers. It is parametrized by a two-claimant rule R.

- The highest claimant (say, claimant 1) suggests a division.
- Each other claimant can either accept or reject the offer.
  - Any claimant that accepts the offer, leaves with it.
  - Any claimant k that rejects the offer, receives the outcome of rule R on the two-claimant problem for k and 1, on the sum of the offers for k and 1.
- The highest claimant receives the remainder.
- The process is repeated with all the rejecters.

If R satisfies resource monotonicity and super-modularity, then the above game has a unique subgame perfect equilibrium, at which each agent receives the amount recommended by the consistent extension of R.

Corchon and Herrero describe the following game. It is parametrized by a "compromise function" (for example: arithmetic mean).

- Agents propose division vectors, which must be bounded by the claims vector.
- The compromise function is used to aggregate the proposals.

A two-claimant rule is implementable in dominant strategies (using arithmetic mean) if-and-only-if it is strictly increasing in each claim, and the allocation of agnet i is a function of $c_i$ and $E-c_j$. Rules for more than two claimants are usually not implementable in dominant strategies.

Dagan, Serrano and Volij present a game in which the claimant with the highest claim propose an allocation, to which the other claimants respond in sequence. For a large class of consistent and monotone bankruptcy rules, there is a variant of this game which yields the rule in a Nash equilibrium. Moreover, for monotone and supermodular bilateral principles, every subgame perfect equilibrium is coalition-proof.

== Implementation game for downward-manipulation of claims ==
Dagan, Serrano and Volij consider a setting in which the claims are private information. Claimants may report false claims, as long as they are lower than the true ones. This assumption is relevant in taxation, where claimants may report incomes lower than the true ones. For each rule that is consistent and strictly-claims-monotonic (a person with higher claim gets strictly more), they construct a sequential game that implements this rule in subgame-perfect equilibrium.

== Bargaining games ==
Tsay and Yeh introduce games in which the bilateral negotiations underlying a consistent rule are themselves resolved by non-cooperative bargaining procedures rather than by simply applying the rule. By varying the bargaining procedure so as to capture the spirit of each rule, they strategically justify the constrained equal awards rule, the constrained equal losses rule, the proportional rule and the Talmud rule, and in doing so reveal new relations among these central rules.

Moreno-Ternero, Tsay and Yeh design a game inspired by an axiomatization of the TAL-family of rules (the parametric family that connects the constrained equal awards, Talmud and constrained equal losses rules). Bilateral negotiations in the game follow the lower and upper bounds used in that axiomatization, and consistency extends the bilateral outcomes to any number of claimants, so that the equilibrium outcomes reproduce the members of the TAL-family.

Li and Ju propose three strategic bargaining games built around an extended "divide-and-choose" mechanism, whose unique subgame perfect equilibrium outcomes coincide with the constrained equal awards, constrained equal losses and Talmud allocations respectively. Their results are robust to certain forms of incomplete information and extend to related settings such as surplus-sharing problems.

Hagiwara and Hanato provide a procedurally fair, multilateral bargaining game in which all claimants negotiate simultaneously and may renegotiate in later periods, and show that the constrained equal awards rule emerges as the unique subgame perfect equilibrium outcome.

== Claim games ==
In a claim game, agents strategically report the claims (or place claims on parts of the estate), and the strategic question is what allocations arise in equilibrium. This class of games goes back to the game of O'Neill described above.

Ashlagi, Karagozoglu and Klaus study a direct-revelation claim game, a variant of the Nash demand game in which over-claiming is punished only mildly. They show that for any rule satisfying efficiency, equal treatment of equals and order-preservation, all pure-strategy Nash equilibria induce equal division; their reading is that when the legitimacy of claims cannot be checked, the conflict escalates and equal division is the natural non-discriminating outcome.

Peters, Schröder and Vermeulen generalize the integer claim game of O'Neill by allowing an arbitrary sharing rule to divide each interval of the estate among the claimants who claim it. For an estate larger than half of the total of the entitlements, they show that every sharing rule satisfying four fairly general axioms yields the same set of Nash equilibrium profiles and payoffs; the rules that always deliver this equilibrium payoff vector are exactly those characterized by the properties of minimal rights first and lower bound of degree one-half, which include the Talmud rule, the adjusted proportional rule and the random arrival rule.

== Manipulation by pre-donations ==
Sertel considers a two-claimant setting in which a claimant may manipulate by pre-donating some of his claims to the other claimant. The payoff is then calculated using the Nash Bargaining Solution. In equilibrium, both claimants receive the payoffs prescribed by the contested garment rule.

== Manipulation via the estate ==
Karagozoglu introduces a class of bankruptcy problems in which the value of the estate is endogenous and depends on the claimants' own investment decisions, rather than being fixed in advance. Each claimant chooses between investing in a company (a risky asset, which may go bankrupt) and depositing money in a savings account (a risk-free asset), while the company management chooses a bankruptcy rule so as to maximize its profit; the claimants differ in their incomes. Considering the three most prominent rules, namely the proportional rule, the constrained equal awards rule and the constrained equal losses rule, Karagozoglu shows that only the proportional rule is part of any pure-strategy subgame perfect equilibrium. This result is robust to changes in the income distribution and extends to larger sets of rules and to multiple types of claimants, though it may break down once several competing companies are introduced.

== Manipulation via merging and splitting ==
A different strand of the literature studies manipulation not through the choice of an action in a game, but through misrepresentation of the claims themselves, by merging several claims into one or by splitting one claim into several.

de Frutos studies rules that are immune to manipulation by the creditors via merging or splitting of their individual claims. A rule is said to be non-manipulable via merging if no group of claimants can gain by consolidating their claims into a single claim, and non-manipulable via splitting if no claimant can gain by distributing a claim among several claimants (possibly fictitious). de Frutos provides characterization theorems for the non-manipulable rules, as well as for the parametric rules that display no advantageous merging and for those that display no advantageous splitting. A rule that is simultaneously non-manipulable via merging and via splitting is, on the unrestricted domain, essentially the proportional rule; this connection between immunity to manipulation and proportionality had first been noted by O'Neill when characterizing the proportional rule.

Ju refines this analysis by restricting the coalitional operations that are allowed: he permits only pairwise mergers and pairwise splits, that is, operations involving two claimants at a time. Under this weaker requirement, together with the standard axioms of equal treatment of equals, consistency and continuity, he characterizes a family of parametric rules that are either non-manipulable via pairwise merging or non-manipulable via pairwise splitting.

Ju, Miyagawa and Sakai generalize these results considerably. They characterize division rules under which no group of claimants can increase the total amount they jointly receive by transferring their characteristics (such as claims) among the members of the group; this property is called reallocation-proofness (or no advantageous reallocation). By allowing the claimants' characteristics to be multi-dimensional and interpreting the variables appropriately, their model subsumes not only the classical bankruptcy problem but also a number of related allocation problems, such as cost sharing, income redistribution, bankruptcy with several types of assets, and probability updating. They further strengthen de Frutos by relaxing non-negativity of awards to one-sided boundedness, which requires only that payments be bounded either from above or from below.

Moreno-Ternero examines the same relationship between proportionality and immunity to manipulation via merging or splitting on restricted domains. He gives an alternative proof of the classical result that, on an unrestricted domain, immunity to manipulation is equivalent to proportional division, and shows that this equivalence continues to hold on restricted but sufficiently rich domains, such as the domain of simple problems and the domain of zero-normalized problems.

== Costly claims manipulation and auditing ==
Landsburg considers a setting in which claims are private information, and claimants may report false claims, but this manipulation is costly. The cost of manipulation increases with the magnitude of manipulation. In the special case in which the sum of claims equals the estate, there is a single generalized rule that is a truthful mechanism, and it is a generalization of constrained equal losses.

One way to make manipulation costly, in order to deter claim manipulation, is to verify reported claims through auditing. Since checking is also costly, the designer must decide whom to audit and how to combine auditing with the allocation rule so that claimants are deterred from misreporting. This connects the strategic bankruptcy problem to the mechanism design literature on costly state verification; in the model of Landsburg described above, the cost of manipulation may be interpreted as an auditing or verification cost. See optimal auditing for more details.
