= Contested garment rule =

Jewish bankruptcy guidance

Each claimant receives the proportion unclaimed by the other, and the remainder is then divided equally

The contested garment (CG) rule, also called concede-and-divide, is a division rule for solving problems of conflicting claims (also called "bankruptcy problems"). The idea is that, if one claimant's claim is less than 100% of the estate to divide, then they effectively concede the unclaimed estate to the other claimant. Therefore, the amount conceded by the claimant is first given to the other claimant. The remaining amount is then divided equally among the two claimants.

The CG rule first appeared in the Mishnah, exemplified by a case of conflict over a garment, hence the name. In the Mishnah, it was described only for two-people problems. But in 1985, Robert Aumann and Michael Maschler have proved that, in every bankruptcy problem, there is a unique division that is consistent with the CG rule for each pair of claimants. They call the rule, that selects this unique division, the CG-consistent rule. In the literature it is also called the Talmud rule.

== Problem description ==
There is a divisible resource, denoted by $E$ (=Estate or Endowment). There are n people who claim this resource or parts of it; they are called claimants. The amount claimed by each claimant i is denoted by $c_i$. We denote $c_N := \sum_{i=1}^n c_i =$the total claim. $c_N > E$, that is, the estate is insufficient to satisfy all the claims. The goal is to allocate to each claimant an amount $x_i$ such that $\sum_{i=1}^n x_i = E$.

== Two claimants ==
With two claimants, the CG rule works in the following way.

- Truncate each claim to the estate (since one is not allowed to claim more than the entire estate). That is, set $c_i' := \min(c_i,E)$ for each claimant i.
- Allocate to claimant 1 an amount $E-c_2'$ that is, the amount not claimed by 2.
- Allocate to claimant 2 an amount $E-c_1'$ that is, the amount not claimed by 1.
- The remainder is $E-(E-c_2')-(E-c_1') = c_1'+c_2'-E$; divide it equally among the claimants.

Summing the amounts given to each claimant, we can write the following formula:

$CG(c_1,c_2; E) = \left( \frac{E+c_1'-c_2'}{2}~,~\frac{E+c_2'-c_1'}{2} \right)$

For example:

- If $E=1$ and $c_1=c_2=1$, then both claimants get 1/2, that is, $CG(1,1; 1) = (1/2, 1/2)$.
- If $E=1$ and $c_1=1$ and $c_2=1/2$. then claimant 1 gets 3/4 and claimant 2 gets 1/4, that is, $CG(1,1/2; 1) = (3/4, 1/4)$.

These two examples are first mentioned in the first Mishnah of Bava Metzia:

"Two are holding a garment. One says, "I found it," and the other says, "I found it":

- If one says "all of it is mine" and the other says "all of it is mine", then this one shall swear that he owns no less than half of it, and this one shall swear that he owns no less than half of it, and they shall divide it between them.
- If one says, "all of it is mine" and the other says "half of it is mine", then the one who says "all of it is mine" shall swear that he owns no less than three quarters of it; and the one who says "half of it is mine" shall swear that he owns no less than one quarter of it; the former takes three quarters and the latter takes one quarter."

== Many claimants ==
To extend the CG rule to problems with three or more claimants, we apply the general principle of consistency (also called coherence), which says that every part of a fair division should be fair. In particular, we seek an allocation that respects the CG rule for each pair of claimants. That is, for every claimants i and j:

$(x_i, x_j) = CG(c_i, c_j; x_i+x_j)$.

Apriori, it is not clear that such an allocation always exists, or that it is unique. However, it can be proved that a unique CG-consistent allocation always exists. It can be described by the following algorithm:

- If $E \leq c_N/2$ (that is, the total estate is less than half the total claims), then apply the rule of constrained equal awards to half the claims, that is, return $CEA(c_1/2,\ldots,c_n/2; E)$.
- iF $E \geq c_N/2$, then give each claimant half of his/her claim, and then apply the rule of constrained equal losses to the remainder, that is, return $(c_1/2,\ldots,c_n/2) + CEL(c_1/2,\ldots,c_n/2; E-c_N/2)$.

The resulting rule is also called the Talmud rule.

Note that, with two claimants, once the claims are truncated to be at most the estate, the condition $E\geq c_N/2$ always holds. For example:

- $CG(1,1/2; 1) = (1/2,1/4) + CEL(1/2,1/4; 1/4) = (1/2,1/4) + (1/4, 0) = (3/4,1/4)$.

Here are some three-claimant examples:

- $CG(100,200,300; 100) = (33.333, 33.333, 33.333)$; here CEA is used.
- $CG(100,200,300; 200) = (50, 75, 75)$; here CEA is used.
- $CG(100,200,300; 300) = (50, 100, 150)$; here either CEA or CEL can be used (the result is the same); when the sum of claims is exactly half the estate, each claimant gets exactly half his/her claim.
- $CG(100,200,300; 400) = (50, 125, 225)$; here CEL is used.
- $CG(100,200,300; 500) = (66.667, 166.667, 266.667)$; here CEL is used.
- $CG(100,200,300; 600) = (100, 200, 300)$; here CEL is used.

The first three examples appear in another Mishnah, in Ketubot:

"Suppose a man, who was married to three women, died; the marriage contract of one wife was for 100 dinars, and the marriage contract of the second wife was for 200 dinars, and the marriage contract of the third wife was for 300, and all three contracts were issued on the same date so that none of the wives has precedence over any of the others.

- If the total value of the estate is only 100 dinars, the wives divide the estate equally.
- If there were 200 dinars in the estate, the first wife takes 50 dinars, while the other two wives take three dinars of gold each, which are the equivalent of 75 silver dinars.
- If there were 300 dinars in the estate, the first wife takes 50 dinars, the second takes 100 dinars, and the third takes six dinars of gold, the equivalent of 150 silver dinars."

=== Constructive description ===
The CG rule can be described in a constructive way. Suppose E increases from 0 to the half-sum of the claims: the first units are divided equally, until each claimant receives $\min_i(c_i/2)$. Then, the claimant with the smallest $c_i$ is put on hold, and the next units are divided equally among the remaining claimants until each of them up to the next-smallest $c_i$. Then, the claimant with the second-smallest $c_i$ is put on hold too. This goes on until either the estate is fully divided, or each claimant gets exactly $c_i/2$. If some estate remains, then the losses are divided in a symmetric way, starting with an estate equal to the sum of all claims, and decreasing down to half this sum.

=== Explicit formula ===
Elishakoff and Dancygier present an explicit formula for the CG rule for n claimants.

== Properties ==
CG satisfies independence of irrelevant claims. This means that increasing the claim above the total estate does not change the allocation. Formally: $CG(c,E) = CG(\min(c,E), E)$.

CG is self-dual. This means that it treats gains and losses symmetrically: it divides gains in the same way that it divides losses. Formally: $CG(c,E) = c - CG(c, C - E)$, where C is the sum of all claims.

CG satisfies equal treatment of equals: agents with the same claim will get exactly the same allocation.

CG satisfies separability: define $v_i = \max(0, E- \sum_j c_j)$ = the sum conceded to i by all other agents. Then, CG can be separated to two phases as follows: first, each agent i gets v_{i}; then, the same rule is activated on the remaining claims and the remaining estate.

- Note that separability is the dual of independence-of-irrelevant-claims.

CG satisfies securement. This means that each agent with a feasible claim (c_{i} ≤ E) is guaranteed at least 1/n of their claim: $CG(c,E)_i \geq \min(c_i,E)/n$ (this property is similar to proportionality). In fact, CG satisfies a stronger property: $CG(c,E)_i \geq \min(c_i/2,E/n)$.

CG also satisfies the dual property to securement: the loss of each agent i with claim at most the total loss C-E, is at least 1/n of their claim: $c_i - CG(c,E)_i \geq \min(c_i,C-E)/n$.

=== Characterizations ===
Nir Dagan proved two characterizations of CG:

- For two claimants, CG is the unique rule that satisfies both self-duality and independence of irrelevant claims.
- For two claimants, CG is the unique rule that satisfies both self-duality and separability.
- For two claimants, CG is the unique rule that satisfies independence of irrelevant claims, equal treatment of equals, and separability.

Moreno-Ternero and Villar proved that CG is characterized by each of the following combinations:

- CG is the unique rule that satisfies self-duality, securement and consistency.
- CG is the unique rule that satisfies securement, dual securement, and consistency.

They show that these characterizations are tight:

- The Proportional rule satisfies self-duality and consistency, but not securement (e.g. if the claims are E and 2E, then the first claimant gets only E/3).
- The Truncated proportional rule (applying the proportional rule after truncating all claims to E) satisfies securement, but it is not self-dual and does not satisfiy dual-securement (e.g. if the claims are E/2 and E, then the first claimant gets E/3. This is more than 1/2 of their claim, so securement is satisfied. However, their loss is only E/6 which is 1/3 of their claim, rather than 1/n).
- The Adjusted proportional rule is self-dual and satisfies securement and its dual, but it is not consistent.
- The Constrained equal awards rule satisfies securement and consistency, but it is not self-dual and does not satisfiy dual-securement.
- The Constrained equal losses rule rule satisfies dual-securement and consistency, but it is not self-dual and does not satisfiy securement.

See also: More characterization of the Talmud rule.

== Equality ==
Ly, Zakharevich, Kosheleva and Kreinovich prove that CG for two agents satisfies a fairness notion based on equal distance from a status quo point. Several other rules are based on this fairness notion, e.g.:

- Constrained equal awards aims to equalize the distance from the status-quo point (0,0);
- Constrained equal losses aims to equalize the distance from the status-quo point (c_{1},c_{2}).

This raises the question of what status-quo points are reasonable. For each claimant, there can be a whole interval of possible status-quo points, for example:

- If E ≤ c_{1} ≤ c_{2}, then for both agents the range of possible outcomes is [0,E], so the status quo point can be any point in [0,E]x[0,E].
- If c_{1} ≤ E ≤ c_{2}, then for agent 1 the range of possible outcomes is [0, c_{1}] as the agent cannot get more than their claim. For agent 2, the worst outcome is that agent 1 gets c_{1}; hence the range of possible outcomes is [E-c_{1}, E].
- If c_{1} ≤ c_{2} ≤ E, then for agent 1 the range of possible outcomes is [E-c_{2}, c_{1}], and similarly for agent 2 the range is [E-c_{1}, c_{2}].

The agents can be optimistic and look at the highest values in their interval, or be pessimistic and look at the lowest values in their interval, or in general look at any intermediate point r*max+(1-r)*min, where r is the "optimism coefficient". For any optimism coefficient r, we get a different status-quo point.

The CG rule selects, for any optimism coefficient r, an outcome in which both claimants are equally distant from their status-quo point corresponding to r.

== Game-theoretic analysis ==
=== Nash equilibrium of competitive game ===
O'Neill describes the following game.

- The estate is divided to small units (for example, if all claims are integers, then the estate can be divided into E units of size 1).
- Each claimant i chooses some $c_i$ units.
- Each unit is divided equally among all agents who claim it.

Naturally, the agents would try to choose units such that the overlap between different agents is minimal. This game has a Nash equilibrium. In any Nash equilibrium, there is some integer k such that each unit is claimed by either k or k+1 claimants. When there are two claimants, there is a unique equilibrium payoff vector, and it is identical to the one returned by CG.

=== Nucleolus of cooperative game ===
The CG rule can be derived independently, as the nucleolus of a certain cooperative game defined based on the claims.

=== Manipulation by pre-donation ===
Sertel considers a special case of a two-claimant setting, in which the endowment E is equal to the larger claim (E = c_{2} ≥ c_{1}). This special case corresponds to a cooperative bargaining problem in which the feasible set is a triangle with vertices (0,0), (c_{1},0), (0,c_{2}), and the disagreement point is (0,0). The payoff is calculated using the Nash Bargaining Solution. A claimant may manipulate by pre-donating some of their claims to the other claimant. In equilibrium, both claimants receive the payoffs prescribed by CG.

== Piniles' rule ==
Zvi Menahem Piniles, a 19th-century Jewish scholar, presented a different rule to explain the cases in Ketubot. His rule is similar to the CG rule, but it is not consistent with the CG rule when there are two claimants. The rule works as follows:

- If the sum of claims is larger than 2E, then it applies the CEA rule on half the claims, that is, it returns $CEA(c_1/2,\ldots,c_n/2; E)$ .
- Otherwise, it gives each agent half its claim and then applies CEA on the remainder, that is, it returns $(c_1/2,\ldots,c_n/2) + CEA(c_1/2,\ldots,c_n/2; E-\sum_{j=1}^n c_j/2)$ .

Examples with two claimants:

- $PINI(60,90; 100) = (42.5, 57.5)$. Initially the claimants get (30,45). The remaining claims are (30,45) and the remaining estate is 25, so it is divided equally.
- $PINI(50,100; 100) = (37.5, 62.5)$. Initially the claimants get (25,50). The remaining claims are (25,50) and the remaining estate is 25, so it is divided equally.
- $PINI(50,100; 100) = (37.5, 62.5)$. Initially the claimants get (25,50). The remaining claims are (25,50) and the remaining estate is 25, so it is divided equally.

Examples with three claimants:

- $PINI(100,200,300; 100) = (33.333, 33.333, 33.333)$. Here the sum of claims is more than twice the estate, so the outcome is $CEA(50,100,150; 100) = (33.333, 33.333, 33.333)$.
- $PINI(100,200,300; 200) = (50, 75, 75)$. Again the sum of claims is more than twice the estate, so the outcome is $CEA(50,100,150; 200) = (50, 75, 75)$.
- $PINI(100,200,300; 300) = (50, 100, 150)$. Again the sum of claims is more than twice the estate, so the outcome is $CEA(50,100,150; 300) = (50, 100, 150)$.

== Generalization ==
=== TAL Family ===
Moreno-Ternero and Villar define a family of rules, which they call the TAL family, which generalizes the Talmud rule, as well as constrained equal awards and constrained equal losses. Each rule in the TAL family is parameterized by a parameter t in [0,1]. The TAL_t rule divides the estate as follows:

- If $E \leq t\cdot c_N$, then the outcome is $CEA(t c_1,\ldots,t c_n; E)$; so each claimant i receives at most $t\cdot c_i$.
- If $E = t\cdot c_N$, then each claimant i receives exactly $t\cdot c_i$.
- If $E \geq t\cdot c_N$, then the outcome is $(t c_1,\ldots,t c_n) + CEL((1-t) c_1,\ldots,(1-t) c_n; E-t c_N)$; so each claimant i receives at least $t\cdot c_i$.

An equivalent description is: the claimants receive money in an equal rate, until the lowest claimant (1) has received t*c_{1}. Then the lowest claimant exits, and the others continue until the second-lowest (2) claimant has received t*c_{2}. This goes on until all claimants have received $t\cdot c_i$. If there is remaining amount, then the claimants enter again, from the highest to the lowest, and get money until their losses are equal.

In this family, TAL-0 is CEL; TAL-1/2 is CG; and TAL-1 is CEA. The dual of TAL_t is TAL_(1-t). All rules in this family have the following properties:

- They are parametric: agent i's award depends only on c_{i} and on some parameter that depends on E.
- They satisfy equal treatment of equals.
- They are continuous.
- They are consistent.
- They are order-preserving: agents with higher claims get higher rewards and suffer higher losses.
- They satisfy claims-monotonicity: increasing a claim weakly increases the award.
- They are homogeneous: multiplying the claims and the endowment by the same positive number yields multiplication of the outcome by the same number.
- They satisfy resource monotonicity.

Some properties are satisfied only by subsets of the TAL family:

- All and only TAL-t rules with t in [1/2,1] are independent of irrelevant claims (claims larger than E can be truncated to E with no effect on the outcome), and satisfy securement.
- All and only TAL-t rules with t in [0,1/2] are separable (satisfy composition from minimal independent), and satisfy the dual of securement.
- Only CEA and CEL satisfy composition up and composition down.
- If t_{1} ≥ t_{2}, then the outcome of TAL-t_{1} always dominates the outcome TAL-t_{2} in the Lorenz ordering (which means, intuitively, that it is more egalitarian)

=== Reverse TAL Family ===
Van-der-Brink, Funaki and van-der-Laan introduce the reverse Talmud rule, which applies CEL for small estates and CEA for large estates. They axiomatize it by using weak variants of the Exemption and Exclusion properties.

Van-der-Brink and Moreno-Ternero extend this rule to the reverse Tal family, in which each rule is parameterized by the threshold between small estates and large estates. They study the structural properties of the rules within the family and its connections to existing rules.
