= Nondimensionalization =

Mathematical simplification technique in physical sciences

Nondimensionalization is the partial or full removal of physical dimensions from an equation involving physical quantities by a suitable substitution of variables. This technique can simplify and parameterize problems where measured units are involved. It is closely related to dimensional analysis. In some physical systems, the term scaling is used interchangeably with nondimensionalization, in order to suggest that certain quantities are better measured relative to some appropriate unit. These units refer to quantities intrinsic to the system, rather than units such as SI units. Nondimensionalization is not the same as converting extensive quantities in an equation to intensive quantities, since the latter procedure results in variables that still carry units.

Nondimensionalization can also recover characteristic properties of a system. For example, if a system has an intrinsic resonance frequency, length, or time constant, nondimensionalization can recover these values. The technique is especially useful for systems that can be described by differential equations. One important use is in the analysis of control systems. One of the simplest characteristic units is the doubling time of a system experiencing exponential growth, or conversely the half-life of a system experiencing exponential decay.

Many illustrative examples of nondimensionalization originate from simplifying differential equations. This is because a large body of physical problems can be formulated in terms of differential equations. Consider the following:

- List of dynamical systems and differential equations topics
- List of partial differential equation topics
- Differential equations of mathematical physics

Although nondimensionalization is well adapted for these problems, it is not restricted to them. An example of a non-differential-equation application is dimensional analysis; another example is normalization in statistics.

Measuring devices are practical examples of nondimensionalization occurring in everyday life. Measuring devices are calibrated relative to some known unit. Subsequent measurements are made relative to this standard. Then, the absolute value of the measurement is recovered by scaling with respect to the standard.

== Rationale ==
Suppose a pendulum is swinging with a particular period T. For such a system, it is advantageous to perform calculations relating to the swinging relative to T. In some sense, this is normalizing the measurement with respect to the period.

Measurements made relative to an intrinsic property of a system will apply to other systems which also have the same intrinsic property. It also allows one to compare a common property of different implementations of the same system. Nondimensionalization determines in a systematic manner the characteristic units of a system to use, without relying heavily on prior knowledge of the system's intrinsic properties (one should not confuse characteristic units of a system with natural units of nature). In fact, nondimensionalization can suggest the parameters which should be used for analyzing a system. However, it is necessary to start with an equation that describes the system appropriately.

== Nondimensionalization steps ==
To nondimensionalize a system of equations, one must do the following:

1. Identify all the independent and dependent variables;
2. Replace each of them with a quantity scaled relative to a characteristic unit of measure to be determined;
3. Divide through by the coefficient of the highest order polynomial or derivative term;
4. Choose judiciously the definition of the characteristic unit for each variable so that the coefficients of as many terms as possible become 1;
5. Rewrite the system of equations in terms of their new dimensionless quantities.

The last three steps are usually specific to the problem where nondimensionalization is applied. However, almost all systems require the first two steps to be performed.

=== Conventions ===
There are no restrictions on the variable names used to replace "x" and "t". However, they are generally chosen so that it is convenient and intuitive to use for the problem at hand. For example, if "x" represented mass, the letter "m" might be an appropriate symbol to represent the dimensionless mass quantity.

In this article, the following conventions have been used:

- t – represents the independent variable – usually a time quantity. Its nondimensionalized counterpart is $\tau$.
- x – represents the dependent variable – can be mass, voltage, or any measurable quantity. Its nondimensionalized counterpart is $\chi$.

A subscript 'c' added to a quantity's variable name is used to denote the characteristic unit used to scale that quantity. For example, if x is a quantity, then x_{c} is the characteristic unit used to scale it.

As an illustrative example, consider a first order differential equation with constant coefficients:
$$a\frac{dx}{dt} + bx = Af(t).$$

1. In this equation the independent variable here is t, and the dependent variable is x.
2. Set $x = \chi x_\text{c}, \ t = \tau t_\text{c}$. This results in the equation
  $$a \frac{x_\text{c}}{t_\text{c}} \frac{d \chi}{d \tau} + b x_\text{c} \chi = A f(\tau t_\text{c}) \ \stackrel{\mathrm{def}}{=}\  A F(\tau).$$
3. The coefficient of the highest ordered term is in front of the first derivative term. Dividing by this gives
  $$\frac{d \chi}{d \tau} + \frac{b t_\text{c}}{a} \chi = \frac{A t_\text{c}}{a x_\text{c}} F(\tau).$$
4. The coefficient in front of $\chi$ only contains one characteristic variable t_{c}, hence it is easiest to choose to set this to unity first:

$\frac{b t_\text{c}}{a} = 1 \Rightarrow t_\text{c} = \frac{a}{b}.$	1

Subsequently,

$\frac{A t_\text{c}}{a x_\text{c}} = \frac{A}{b x_\text{c}} = 1 \Rightarrow x_\text{c} = \frac{A}{b}.$	2

1. The final dimensionless equation in this case becomes completely independent of any parameters with units:
  $$\frac{d \chi}{d \tau} + \chi = F(\tau).$$

=== Substitutions ===
Suppose for simplicity that a certain system is characterized by two variables – a dependent variable x and an independent variable t, where x is a function of t. Both x and t represent quantities with units. To scale these two variables, assume there are two intrinsic units of measurement x_{c} and t_{c} with the same units as x and t respectively, such that these conditions hold:
$$\tau = \frac{t}{t_\text{c}} \Rightarrow t = \tau t_\text{c}$$
$$\chi = \frac{x}{x_\text{c}} \Rightarrow  x = \chi x_\text{c}.$$

These equations are used to replace x and t when nondimensionalizing. If differential operators are needed to describe the original system, their scaled counterparts become dimensionless differential operators.

==== Differential operators ====
Consider the relationship
$$t = \tau t_\text{c} \Rightarrow dt = t_\text{c} d\tau \Rightarrow \frac{d\tau}{dt} = \frac{1}{t_\text{c}}.$$

The dimensionless differential operators with respect to the independent variable becomes
$$\frac{d}{dt} = \frac{d \tau}{dt} \frac{d}{d \tau} = \frac{1}{t_\text{c}} \frac{d}{d \tau} \Rightarrow \frac{d^n}{dt^n} = \left( \frac{d}{dt} \right)^n = \left( \frac{1}{t_\text{c}} \frac{d}{d \tau} \right)^n = \frac{1}{{t_\text{c}}^n} \frac{d^n}{d \tau^n}.$$

==== Forcing function ====
If a system has a forcing function $f(t)$ then
$$f(t) = f(\tau t_\text{c}) = f(t(\tau)) = F(\tau).$$

Hence, the new forcing function $F$ is made to be dependent on the dimensionless quantity $\tau$.

== Linear differential equations with constant coefficients ==
=== First order system ===
Consider the differential equation for a first order system:
$$a\frac{dx}{dt} + bx = Af(t).$$

The derivation of the characteristic units to Eq. 1 and Eq. 2 for this system gave
$$t_\text{c} = \frac{a}{b}, \ x_\text{c} = \frac{A}{b}.$$

=== Second order system ===
A second order system has the form
$$a \frac{d^2 x}{dt^2} + b\frac{dx}{dt} + cx = A f(t).$$

==== Substitution step ====
Replace the variables x and t with their scaled quantities. The equation becomes

$$a \frac{x_\text{c}}{{t_\text{c}}^2} \frac{ d^2 \chi}{d \tau^2} + b \frac{x_\text{c}}{t_\text{c}} \frac{d \chi}{d \tau} + c x_\text{c} \chi = A f(\tau t_\text{c}) = A F(\tau) .$$

This new equation is not dimensionless, although all the variables with units are isolated in the coefficients. Dividing by the coefficient of the highest ordered term, the equation becomes

$$\frac{d^2 \chi}{d \tau^2} + t_\text{c} \frac{b}{a}  \frac{d \chi}{d \tau} + {t_\text{c}}^2 \frac{c}{a} \chi = \frac{A {t_\text{c}}^2}{a x_\text{c}} F(\tau).$$

Now it is necessary to determine the quantities of x_{c} and t_{c} so that the coefficients become normalized. Since there are two free parameters, at most only two coefficients can be made to equal unity.

==== Determination of characteristic units ====
Consider the variable t_{c}:

1. If $t_\text{c} = \frac{a}{b}$ the first order term is normalized.
2. If $t_\text{c} = \sqrt{\frac{a}{c}}$ the zeroth order term is normalized.

Both substitutions are valid. However, for pedagogical reasons, the latter substitution is used for second order systems. Choosing this substitution allows x_{c} to be determined by normalizing the coefficient of the forcing function:
$$1 = \frac{A t_\text{c}^2}{a x_\text{c}} =  \frac{A}{c x_\text{c}} \Rightarrow x_\text{c} = \frac{A}{c}.$$

The differential equation becomes
$$\frac{d^2 \chi}{d \tau^2} + \frac{b}{\sqrt{ac}} \frac{d \chi}{d\tau} + \chi = F(\tau).$$

The coefficient of the first order term is unitless. Define
$$2 \zeta \ \stackrel{\mathrm{def}}{=}\  \frac{b}{\sqrt{ac}}.$$

The factor 2 is present so that the solutions can be parameterized in terms of ζ. In the context of mechanical or electrical systems, ζ is known as the damping ratio, and is an important parameter required in the analysis of control systems. 2ζ is also known as the linewidth of the system. The result of the definition is the universal oscillator equation.
$$\frac{d^2 \chi}{d \tau^2} + 2 \zeta \frac{d \chi}{d\tau} + \chi = F(\tau) .$$

=== Higher order systems ===
The general nth order linear differential equation with constant coefficients has the form:
$$a_n \frac{d^n}{dt^n} x(t) + a_{n-1} \frac{d^{n-1}}{dt^{n-1}} x(t) + \ldots + a_1 \frac{d}{dt} x(t) + a_0 x(t) = \sum_{k = 0}^n  a_k \big( \frac{d}{dt} \big) ^k x(t) = Af(t).$$

The function f(t) is known as the forcing function.

If the differential equation only contains real (not complex) coefficients, then the properties of such a system behaves as a mixture of first and second order systems only. This is because the roots of its characteristic polynomial are either real, or complex conjugate pairs. Therefore, understanding how nondimensionalization applies to first and second ordered systems allows the properties of higher order systems to be determined through superposition.

The number of free parameters in a nondimensionalized form of a system increases with its order. For this reason, nondimensionalization is rarely used for higher order differential equations. The need for this procedure has also been reduced with the advent of symbolic computation.

=== Examples of recovering characteristic units ===
A variety of systems can be approximated as either first or second order systems. These include mechanical, electrical, fluidic, caloric, and torsional systems. This is because the fundamental physical quantities involved within each of these examples are related through first and second order derivatives.

==== Mechanical oscillations ====
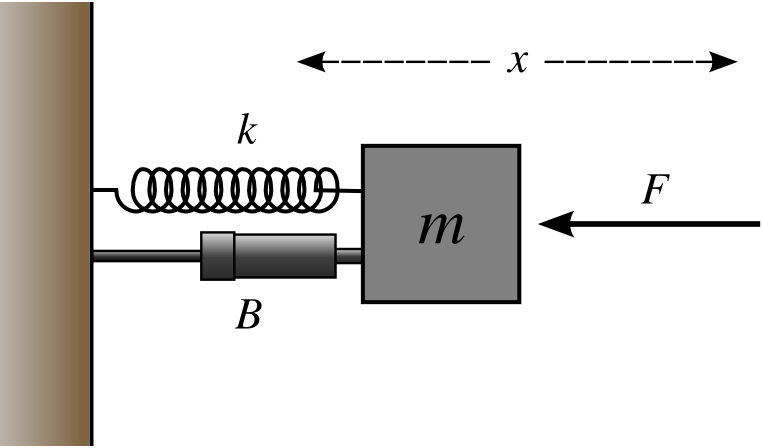
A mass attached to a spring and a damper.

Suppose we have a mass attached to a spring and a damper, which in turn are attached to a wall, and a force acting on the mass along the same line. Define

- $x$ = displacement from equilibrium [m]
- $t$ = time [s]
- $f$ = external force or "disturbance" applied to system [kg⋅m⋅s^{−2}]
- $m$ = mass of the block [kg]
- $B$ = damping constant of dashpot [kg⋅s^{−1}]
- $k$ = force constant of spring [kg⋅s^{−2}]

Suppose the applied force is a sinusoid F = F_{0} cos(ωt), the differential equation that describes the motion of the block is
$$m \frac{d^2 x}{d t^2} + B \frac{d x}{d t} + kx = F_0 \cos(\omega t)$$

Nondimensionalizing this equation the same way as described under § Second order system yields several characteristics of the system:

- The intrinsic unit x_{c} corresponds to the distance the block moves per unit force

$$x_\text{c} = \frac{F_0}{k}.$$

- The characteristic variable t_{c} is equal to the period of the oscillations

$$t_\text{c} = \sqrt{\frac{m}{k}}$$

- The dimensionless variable 2ζ corresponds to the linewidth of the system.

$$2 \zeta = \frac{B}{\sqrt{mk}}$$

- ζ itself is the damping ratio

==== Electrical oscillations ====
===== First-order series RC circuit =====
For a series RC attached to a voltage source
$$R \frac{dQ}{dt} + \frac{Q}{C} = V(t) \Rightarrow \frac{d \chi}{d \tau} + \chi = F(\tau)$$
with substitutions
$$Q = \chi x_\text{c}, \ t = \tau t_\text{c}, \ x_\text{c} = C V_0, \ t_\text{c} = RC, \ F = V.$$

The first characteristic unit corresponds to the total charge in the circuit. The second characteristic unit corresponds to the time constant for the system.

===== Second-order series RLC circuit =====
For a series configuration of R, C, L components where Q is the charge in the system
$$L \frac{d^2 Q}{dt^2} + R \frac{d Q}{d t} + \frac{Q}{C} = V_0 \cos(\omega t) \Rightarrow \frac{d^2 \chi}{d \tau^2} + 2 \zeta \frac{d \chi}{d\tau} + \chi = \cos(\Omega \tau)$$
with the substitutions
$$Q = \chi x_\text{c}, \ t = \tau t_\text{c}, \ \ x_\text{c} = C V_0, \ t_\text{c} = \sqrt{LC}, \ 2 \zeta = R \sqrt{\frac{C}{L}}, \ \Omega = t_\text{c} \omega.$$

The first variable corresponds to the maximum charge stored in the circuit. The resonance frequency is given by the reciprocal of the characteristic time. The last expression is the linewidth of the system. The Ω can be considered as a normalized forcing function frequency.

=== Quantum mechanics ===
==== Quantum harmonic oscillator ====
The Schrödinger equation for the one-dimensional time independent quantum harmonic oscillator is
$$\left(-\frac{\hbar^2}{2m} \frac{d^2}{d x^2} + \frac{1}{2}m \omega^2 x^2\right) \psi(x) = E \psi(x).$$

The modulus square of the wavefunction |ψ(x)|^{2} represents probability density that, when integrated over x, gives a dimensionless probability. Therefore, |ψ(x)|^{2} has units of inverse length. To nondimensionalize this, it must be rewritten as a function of a dimensionless variable. To do this, we substitute
$$\tilde x \equiv \frac{x}{x_{\text{c}}},$$
where x_{c} is some characteristic length of this system. This gives us a dimensionless wave function $\tilde \psi$ defined via
$$\psi(x) = \psi(\tilde x x_{\text{c}}) = \psi(x(\tilde x)) = \tilde \psi(\tilde x).$$

The differential equation then becomes
$$\left(-\frac{\hbar^2}{2m} \frac{1}{x_{\text{c}}^2} \frac{d^2}{d \tilde x^2} + \frac{1}{2} m \omega^2 x_{\text{c}}^2 \tilde x^2 \right) \tilde \psi(\tilde x) = E \, \tilde \psi(\tilde x)
\Rightarrow
\left(-\frac{d^2}{d \tilde x^2} + \frac{m^2 \omega^2 x_{\text{c}}^4}{\hbar^2} \tilde x^2 \right) \tilde \psi(\tilde x) = \frac{2 m x_{\text{c}}^2 E}{\hbar^2} \tilde \psi(\tilde x).$$

To make the term in front of $\tilde x^2$ dimensionless, set
$$\frac{m^2 \omega^2 x_{\text{c}}^4}{\hbar^2} = 1 \Rightarrow x_{\text{c}} = \sqrt{\frac{\hbar}{m \omega}} .$$

The fully nondimensionalized equation is
$$\left(-\frac{d^2}{d \tilde x^2} + \tilde x^2 \right) \tilde \psi(\tilde x) = \tilde E \tilde \psi(\tilde x),$$
where we have defined
$$E \equiv \frac{\hbar \omega}{2} \tilde E.$$
The factor in front of $\tilde E$ is in fact (coincidentally) the ground state energy of the harmonic oscillator. Usually, the energy term is not made dimensionless as we are interested in determining the energies of the quantum states. Rearranging the first equation, the familiar equation for the harmonic oscillator becomes
$$\frac{\hbar \omega}{2}  \left( -\frac{d^2}{d \tilde x^2} + \tilde x^2 \right) \tilde \psi(\tilde x) = E \tilde \psi(\tilde x).$$

== Statistical analogs ==
In statistics, the analogous process is usually dividing a difference (a distance) by a scale factor (a measure of statistical dispersion), which yields a dimensionless number, which is called normalization. Most often, this is dividing errors or residuals by the standard deviation or sample standard deviation, respectively, yielding standard scores and studentized residuals.

== See also ==
- Buckingham π theorem
- Dimensionless number
- Natural units
- System equivalence
- RLC circuit
- RL circuit
- RC circuit
- Logistic equation
- Per-unit system
