= Romanas =

Romanas is a masculine Lithuanian given name. Notable people with the name include:

- Romanas Chodakauskas (1883–1932), Lithuanian military officer
- Romanas "OJ" Frederique Jr., American football player
- Romanas Januškevičius (born 1953), Lithuanian mathematician
- Romanas Plečkaitis (1933–2009), Lithuanian philosopher
