= Constrained equal awards =

Division rule for solving bankruptcy problems

Constrained equal awards (CEA), also called constrained equal gains, is a division rule for solving bankruptcy problems. According to this rule, each claimant should receive an equal amount, except that no claimant should receive more than his/her claim. In the context of taxation, it is known as leveling tax.

== Formal definition ==
There is a certain amount of money to divide, denoted by $E$ (=Estate or Endowment). There are n claimants. Each claimant i has a claim denoted by $c_i$. Usually, $\sum_{i=1}^n c_i > E$, that is, the estate is insufficient to satisfy all the claims.

The CEA rule says that each claimant i should receive $\min(c_i, r)$, where r is a constant chosen such that $\sum_{i=1}^n \min(c_i,r) = E$. The rule can also be described algorithmically as follows:

- Initially, all agents are active, and all agents get 0.
- While there are remaining units of the estate:
  - The next estate unit is divided equally among all active agents.
  - Each agent whose total allocation equals its claim becomes inactive.

== Examples ==
Examples with two claimants:

- $CEA(60,90; 100) = (50,50)$; here $r=50$. In general, when all claims are at least $E/n$, each claimant receives exactly $E/n$.
- $CEA(40,80; 100) = (40,60)$; here $r=60$.

Examples with three claimants:

- $CEA(50,100,150; 100) = (33.333, 33.333, 33.333)$; here $r=33.333$.
- $CEA(50,100,150; 200) = (50, 75, 75)$; here $r=75$.
- $CEA(50,100,150; 300) = (50, 100, 150)$; here $r=150$.
- $CEA(100,200,300; 300) = (100,100,100)$; here $r=100$.
- $CEA(100,200,300; 500) = (100,200,200)$; here $r=200$.

== Usage ==
In the Jewish law, if several creditors have claims to the same bankrupt debtor, all of which have the same precedence (e.g. all loans have the same date), then the debtor's assets are divided according to CEA.

== Characterizations ==
The CEA rule has several characterizations. It is the only rule satisfying the following sets of axioms:

- Equal treatment of equals, invariance under truncation of claims, and composition up;
- Conditional full compensation, and composition down;
- Conditional full compensation, and claims-monotonicity.

== Game-theoretic analysis ==
=== Rule-proposal game ===
Chun describes the following game.

- Each claimant proposes a division rule.
- The proposed rule must satisfy the property of order-preservation (a claimant with a higher claim must have weakly-higher gain and weakly-higher loss).
- All proposed rules are applied to the problem; each claimant's claim is replaced with the maximum amount awarded to him by a proposed rule.
- The process repeats with the revised claims.

The process converges. Moreover, it has a unique Nash equilibrium, in which the payoffs are equal to the ones prescribed by CEA.

=== Amount-proposal game ===
Sonn describes the following sequential game.

- Claimant 1 proposes an amount to claimant 2.
- If claimant 2 accepts, he leaves with it and claimant 1 then proposes an amount to claimant 3, etc.
- If a claimant k rejects, then claimant 1 moves to the end of line, the claimant k starts making offerts to the next claimant.
- The offer made to each claimant i must be at most $c_i$, and at most the remaining amount.
- The process continues until one claimant remains; that claimant gets the remaining estate.

Sonn proves that, when the discount factor approaches 1, the limit of payoff vectors of this game converges to CEA payoff.

== Dual rule ==
The constrained equal losses (CEL) rule is the dual of the CEA rule, that is: for each problem $(c,E)$, we have $CEL(c,E) = c - CEA(c, \sum c - E)$.

== Multi-issue CEA ==
Acosta, Algaba and Sanchez-Soriano extend the bankruptcy model to a model with several different estaets. Each claimant still has one claim, which applies simultaneously to all estates (or to a subset of the estates in which the claimant participates). They extend the CEA rule to this setting, and characterize it using the property of consistency.
