= Proportional rule (bankruptcy) =

The proportional rule is a division rule for solving bankruptcy problems. According to this rule, each claimant should receive an amount proportional to their claim. In the context of taxation, it corresponds to a proportional tax.

== Formal definition ==
There is a certain amount of money to divide, denoted by $E$ (=Estate or Endowment). There are n claimants. Each claimant i has a claim denoted by $c_i$. Usually, $\sum_{i=1}^n c_i > E$, that is, the estate is insufficient to satisfy all the claims.

The proportional rule says that each claimant i should receive $r \cdot c_i$, where r is a constant chosen such that $\sum_{i=1}^n r\cdot c_i = E$. In other words, each agent gets $\frac{c_i}{\sum_{j=1}^n c_j}\cdot E$.

== Examples ==
Examples with two claimants:

- $PROP(60,90; 100) = (40,60)$. That is: if the estate is worth 100 and the claims are 60 and 90, then $r = 2/3$, so the first claimant gets 40 and the second claimant gets 60.
- $PROP(50,100; 100) = (33.333,66.667)$, and similarly $PROP(40,80; 100) = (33.333,66.667)$.

Examples with three claimants:

- $PROP(100,200,300; 100) = (16.667, 33.333, 50)$.
- $PROP(100,200,300; 200) = (33.333, 66.667, 100)$.
- $PROP(100,200,300; 300) = (50, 100, 150)$.

== Characterizations ==
The proportional rule has several characterizations. It is the only rule satisfying the following sets of axioms:

- Self-duality and composition-up;
- Self-duality and composition-down;
- No advantageous transfer;
- Resource linearity;
- No advantageous merging and no advantageous splitting.

== Truncated proportional rule ==
There is a variant called truncated-claims proportional rule, in which each claim larger than E is truncated to E, and then the proportional rule is activated. That is, it equals $PROP(c_1',\ldots,c_n',E)$, where $c'_i := \min(c_i, E)$. The results are the same for the two-claimant problems above, but for the three-claimant problems we get:

- $TPROP(100,200,300; 100) = (33.333, 33.333, 33.333)$, since all claims are truncated to 100;
- $TPROP(100,200,300; 200) = (40, 80, 80)$, since the claims vector is truncated to (100,200,200).
- $TPROP(100,200,300; 300) = (50, 100, 150)$, since here the claims are not truncated.

== Adjusted-proportional rule ==
The adjusted proportional rule first gives, to each agent i, their minimal right, which is the amount not claimed by the other agents. Formally, $m_i := \max(0, E-\sum_{j\neq i} c_j)$. Note that $\sum_{i=1}^n c_i \geq E$ implies $m_i \leq c_i$.

Then, it revises the claim of agent i to $c'_i := c_i - m_i$, and the estate to $E' := E - \sum_i m_i$. Note that that $E' \geq 0$.

Finally, it activates the truncated-claims proportional rule, that is, it returns $TPROP(c_1,\ldots,c_n,E') = PROP(c_1'',\ldots,c_n'',E')$, where $c''_i := \min(c'_i, E')$.

With two claimants, the revised claims are always equal, so the remainder is divided equally. Examples:

- $APROP(60,90; 100) = (35,65)$. The minimal rights are $(m_1,m_2) = (10,40)$. The remaining claims are $(c_1',c_2') = (50,50)$ and the remaining estate is $E'=50$; it is divided equally among the claimants.
- $APROP(50,100; 100) = (25,75)$. The minimal rights are $(m_1,m_2) = (0,50)$. The remaining claims are $(c_1',c_2') = (50,50)$ and the remaining estate is $E'=50$.
- $APROP(40,80; 100) = (30,70)$. The minimal rights are $(m_1,m_2) = (20,60)$. The remaining claims are $(c_1',c_2') = (20,20)$ and the remaining estate is $E'=20$.

With three or more claimants, the revised claims may be different. In all the above three-claimant examples, the minimal rights are $(0,0,0)$ and thus the outcome is equal to TPROP, for example, $APROP(100,200,300; 200) = TPROP(100,200,300; 200) = (20, 40, 40)$.

=== Characterization ===
Curiel, Maschler and Tijs prove that the AP-rule returns the tau-value of the coalitional game associated with the bankruptcy problem.

The AP-rule is self-dual. In addition, it is the only rule satisfying the following properties:

- Minimal rights (-separability): the outcome remains the same if we first handle each claimant his minimal right and then apply the same rule to the remainder.
- Equal treatment of equals (-symmetry): claimants with identical claim get identical award.
- Additivity of claims: if one of the claims is partitioned into sub-claims (e.g. one of the claimants dies and leaves his claim to his heirs), the allocation to the other claimants does not change.
- Independence of irrelevant claims (also called "game-theoretic"): the outcome does not change if we truncate each claim larger than E to E.

In contrast, the truncated-proportional rule violates minimal-rights, and the proportional rule violates also Independence-of-irrelevant-claims.

== See also ==
- Proportional division
- Proportional representation
