= Romanas Januškevičius =

Lithuanian mathematician

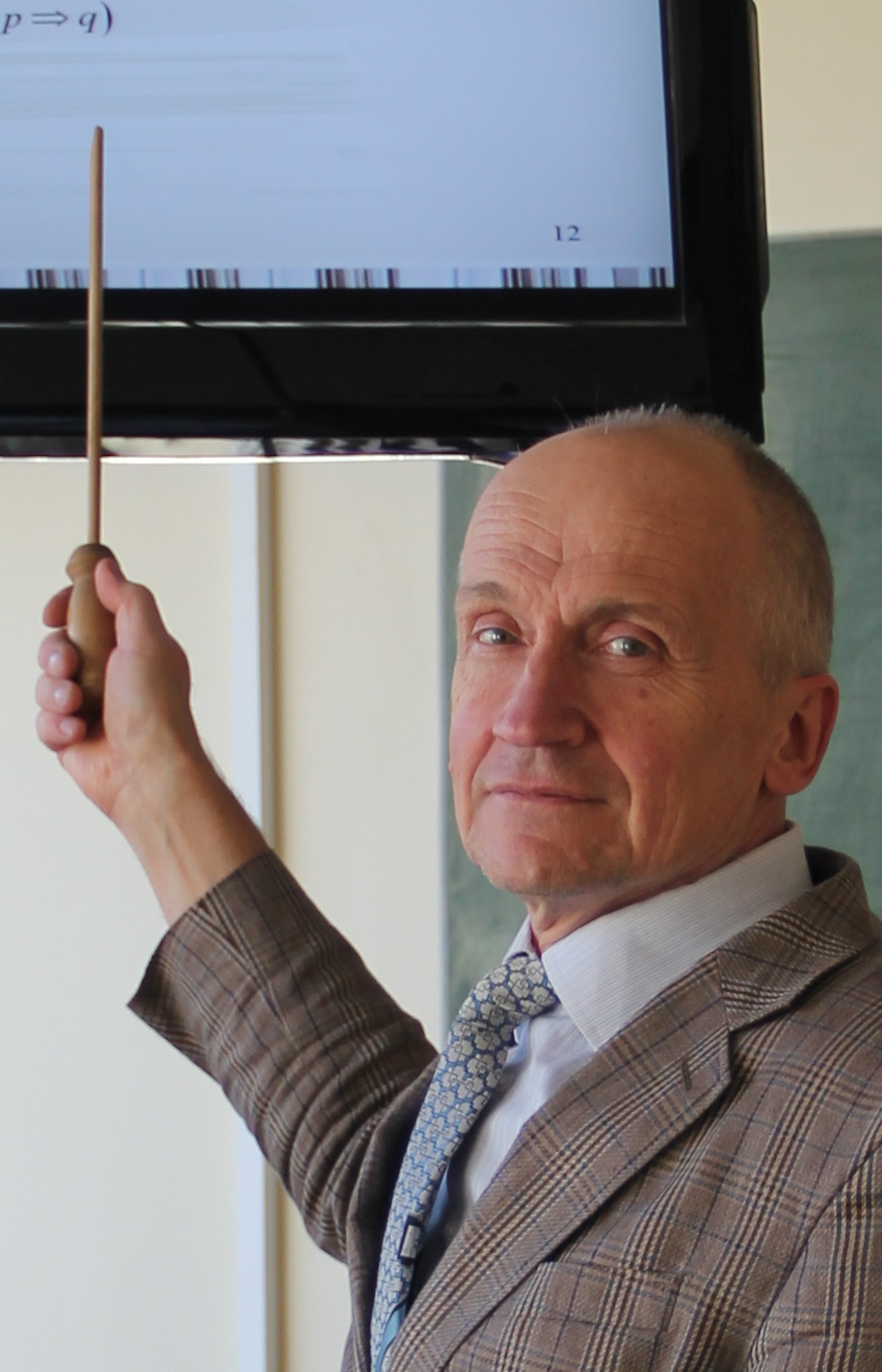
- Romanas Januškevičius in 2016
- Born: 10 July 1953; Vilnius, Lithuania
- Education: Vilnius University; Steklov Institute
- Known for: Characterization of probability distributions and its stability
- Awards: Order of Holy Prince Daniel of Moscow (3rd degree)
- Scientific career
- Fields: Mathematics
- Doctoral advisor: Vladimir Zolotarev

Romanas Januškevičius (sometimes transliterated from Russian as Romanas Yanushkevichius; born July 10, 1953) is a Lithuanian mathematician who worked in probability theory and characterization of probability distributions and its stability. He was a professor at the Lithuanian University of Educational Sciences, head of the Department of Mathematics, Informatics and Physics since 2001 until 2017.

== Early life ==
Januškevičius was born in Vilnius on July 10, 1953. He graduated from one of Vilnius high schools in 1971 and entered Vilnius University, from which he graduated in 1976.

In 1976–1978 Januškevičius trained in Steklov Institute of Mathematics in Moscow, where under the guidance of Professor Vladimir Zolotarev wrote and in 1978 defended his thesis "Investigation of stability in some problems of characterization of distributions" and received the Candidate of Sciences degree. The main result of this thesis was the work of the author, which considered the stability for decompositions of probability distributions into components.

== Work and research interests ==
Januškevičius received the Doctor of Science degree (habilitation) in 1993. His doctoral thesis "Stability for characterizations of distributions" was published as a monograph.

Characterization theorems in probability theory and mathematical statistics are such theorems that establish a connection between the type of the distribution of random variables or random vectors and certain general properties of functions in them. For example, the assumption that two linear (or non-linear) statistics are identically distributed (or independent, or have a constancy regression and so on) can be used to characterize various populations. Verification of conditions of this or that characterization theorem in practice is possible only with some error, i.e., only to a certain degree of accuracy. Such a situation is observed, for instance, in the cases where a sample of finite size is considered. That is why there arises the following natural question. Suppose that the conditions of the characterization theorem are fulfilled not exactly but only approximately. May we assert that the conclusion of the theorem is also fulfilled approximately? Questions of this kind give rise to a following problem: determine the degree of realizability of the conclusions of mathematical statements in the case of approximate validity of conditions.

In solving these problems, a special place is given to the convolution equation. Decisions of non-homogeneous convolution equations on the half and applications for building stability estimations in characterizations of probability distributions devoted one of the major works of the author. His investigation of stability of characterizations of probability distributions R. Januškevičius has completed in the book in 2014.

Januškevičius was a professor at the Vilnius Pedagogical University since 1997 until 2017. The main emphasis of his pedagogical activity is training of teachers of mathematics and informatics.

Januškevičius pays great attention to the field of spiritual enlightenment. What is man? What is the real purpose of short human life? What will happen after death? Is it all going to end after death? Or, on the contrary, everything just starts? Are there absolute laws of human existence? Where lies the boundary between right and wrong? Moreover, why is there so much injustice? For this problems is devoted the book of R. Januškevičius and O. Januškevičienė "Basics of ethics", which has stood 8 editions (1st edition – Vilnius, Open Society Fund-Lithuania, 8th edition – Pro-Press Publisher, Moscow, 2010). The book was translated into the Ukrainian language.

== Awards ==
Patriarch Alexy II during his visit to Vilnius on 25–27 July 1997 personally awarded Januškevičius with the Order of Holy Prince Daniel of Moscow of III degree for the diligent work for the blessing of Orthodoxy in Lithuania in the affair of revival of spirituality.
