= Forcing function (differential equations) =

Function that only depends on time

In a system of differential equations used to describe a time-dependent process, a forcing function is a function that appears in the equations and is only a function of time, and not of any of the other variables. In effect, it is a constant for each value of t.

In the more general case, any nonhomogeneous source function in any variable can be described as a forcing function, and the resulting solution can often be determined using a superposition of linear combinations of the homogeneous solutions and the forcing term.

For example, $f(t)$ is the forcing function in the nonhomogeneous, second-order, ordinary differential equation:
$$ay'' + by' + cy = f(t)$$
