= Characterization (mathematics) =

Term in mathematics

In mathematics, a characterization of an object is a set of conditions that, while possibly different from the definition of the object, is logically equivalent to it. To say that "Property P characterizes object X" is to say that not only does X have property P, but that X is the only thing that has property P (i.e., P is a defining property of X). Similarly, a set of properties P is said to characterize X, when these properties distinguish X from all other objects. Even though a characterization identifies an object in a unique way, several characterizations can exist for a single object. Common mathematical expressions for a characterization of X in terms of P include "P is necessary and sufficient for X", and "X holds if and only if P".

It is also common to find statements such as "Property Q characterizes Y up to isomorphism". The first type of statement says in different words that the extension of P is a singleton set, while the second says that the extension of Q is a single equivalence class (for isomorphism, in the given example — depending on how up to is being used, some other equivalence relation might be involved).

A reference on mathematical terminology notes that characteristic originates from the Greek term kharax, "a pointed stake":

From Greek kharax came kharakhter, an instrument used to mark or engrave an object. Once an object was marked, it became distinctive, so the character of something came to mean its distinctive nature. The Late Greek suffix -istikos converted the noun character into the adjective characteristic, which, in addition to maintaining its adjectival meaning, later became a noun as well.

Just as in chemistry, the characteristic property of a material will serve to identify a sample, or in the study of materials, structures and properties will determine characterization, in mathematics there is a continual effort to express properties that will distinguish a desired feature in a theory or system. Characterization is not unique to mathematics, but since the science is abstract, much of the activity can be described as "characterization". For instance, in Mathematical Reviews, as of 2018, more than 24,000 articles contain the word in the article title, and 93,600 somewhere in the review.

In an arbitrary context of objects and features, characterizations have been expressed via the heterogeneous relation aRb, meaning that object a has feature b. For example, b may mean abstract or concrete. The objects can be considered the extensions of the world, while the features are expressions of the intensions. A continuing program of characterization of various objects leads to their categorization.

== Characterizations in higher mathematics ==
Characterizations are particularly important in higher mathematics, where they take up a large volume of theory in typical undergraduate courses. They are commonly known as "necessary and sufficient conditions," or "if-and-only-if statements." Characterizations help put difficult objects into a form where they are easier to study, and many types of objects in mathematics have multiple characterizations. Sometimes, one characterization in particular is more readily generalizable to abstract settings than the others, and it is often chosen as a definition for the generalized concept.

In real analysis, for example, the completeness property of the real numbers has several useful characterisations:

- The least-upper-bound property
- The greatest-lower-bound property
- The nested interval property
- The Bolzano-Weierstrass theorem
- The convergence of Cauchy sequences

A typical real analysis university course would begin with the first of these, the least-upper-bound property, as an axiomatic definition of the reals (sometimes called the "axiom of completeness" in texts), and gradually prove its way to the last, the convergence of Cauchy sequences. The proofs are quite nontrivial. Among these five characterizations, the Cauchy-sequence perspective turns out to be the easiest to generalize, and is chosen as the definition for the completeness of an abstract metric space. However, the least-upper-bound property is often the most useful to prove facts about real numbers themselves, such as the intermediate value theorem. Thus the most useful and most generalizable characterizations are at times different.

Another example of this phenomenon is found in physics. Hamiltonian mechanics is a characterization of classical mechanics, being equivalent to Newton’s laws. However, it is much easier to generalize to quantum mechanics and statistical mechanics, which is its primary virtue. However, it is a different characterization, Lagrangian mechanics, that is often preferred for the study of classical mechanics itself.

Since a characterization result is equivalent to the initial definition or axiom(s) of the object, it can be used as an equivalent definition, from which the original definition can be proved as a theorem. This leads to the question of which definition is “best” in a given situation, out of many possible options. There is no absolute answer, but the ones that are chosen by authors of books or papers is often a matter of aesthetic or pedagogical considerations, as well as convention, history, and tradition. For real numbers, the least-upper-bound property may have been chosen on the grounds of being easier to learn than Cauchy sequences.

One of the most important results in complex analysis is a characterization result, namely the fact that all locally complex-differentiable functions are analytic (equal to their Taylor series).

Characterisations are very common in abstract algebra, where they often take the form of “structure theorems,” expressing the structure of an object in a simple form. These results are often very difficult to prove. In the theory of matrices, the Jordan Canonical Form is a characterization, or structure theorem, for complex matrices, and the spectral theorem is likewise for symmetric matrices (if real) or Hermitian matrices (if complex). According to the spectral theorem, the real symmetric matrices are precisely the ones that have a basis of perpendicular eigenvectors (called principal axes in physics). In the theory of groups, there is a structure theorem for finite abelian groups, that states that every such group is a direct product of cyclic groups.

As if-and-only-if statements, characterizations are, in a sense, the “strongest” type of mathematical theorem, which is in line with the difficulty of their proofs. Consider a generic mathematical theorem, that A implies B. If B does not imply A, the theorem may be said to be “underpowered”, as the proved statement B is “weaker” than the ingredient A, being not strong enough to prove A on its own. In a characterization, however, B must imply A also – the proved statement is as strong as the ingredient, and it can be no stronger. In a sense, such a result “uses” all of the structure in A in proving B.

== Examples ==
- A rational number, generally defined as a ratio of two integers, can be characterized as a number with finite or repeating decimal expansion.
- A parallelogram is a quadrilateral whose opposing sides are parallel. One of its characterizations is that its diagonals bisect each other. This means that the diagonals in all parallelograms bisect each other, and conversely, that any quadrilateral whose diagonals bisect each other must be a parallelogram.
- "Among probability distributions on the interval from 0 to ∞ on the real line, memorylessness characterizes the exponential distributions." This statement means that the exponential distributions are the only probability distributions that are memoryless, provided that the distribution is continuous as defined above (see Characterization of probability distributions for more).
- "According to Bohr–Mollerup theorem, among all functions f such that f(1) = 1 and x f(x) = f(x + 1) for x > 0, log-convexity characterizes the gamma function." This means that among all such functions, the gamma function is the only one that is log-convex.
- The circle is characterized as a manifold by being one-dimensional, compact and connected; here the characterization, as a smooth manifold, is up to diffeomorphism.

== See also ==
- Characterizations of the category of topological spaces
- Characterizations of the exponential function – Mathematical concept
- Characteristic (algebra) – Smallest integer n for which n equals 0 in a ring
- Characteristic (exponent notation) – Mathematical function
- Classification theorem – Describes the objects of a given type, up to some equivalence
- Euler characteristic – Topological invariant in mathematics
- Character (mathematics)
