= Equal treatment of equals =

Equal treatment of equals is a principle of fair division, a branch of social choice theory and theoretical economics. It means that, if two or more people have exactly the same preferences or other relevant characteristics, then they should receive exactly the same outcome.

Equal treatment of equals is a weak fairness notion, as it says nothing about agents whose preferences or characteristics are even slightly different. For comparison, consider another common fairness notion: envy-freeness. It means that each agent values his own bundle at least as much as the bundle of any other agent. Envy-freeness implies equal treatment of equals, as if two agents have exactly the same preferences, they must receive exactly the same value in order to not envy. However, the opposite direction is not true, as if the agents' preferences are slightly different, the equal-treatment-of-equals principle is vacuously satisfied for any allocation, even if it has envy. Hence, the equal-treatment-of-equals principle can be seen as a bare minimum, that is necessary but not sufficient for fairness.

== See also ==
- Equal pay for equal work
