= Zeuthen (disambiguation) =

Zeuthen may refer to:

- Zeuthen, a town in Brandenburg, Germany
- Else Zeuthen, Danish pacifist and politician
- Hieronymus Georg Zeuthen, Danish mathematician
- Zeuthen Strategy in Game theory (named for Frederik Zeuthen)
