= Sale and purchase of ship =

Aspect of the shipping industry

The sale and purchase of ship is an important aspect of the shipping industry. It may involve large amounts of money and requires brokers to possess knowledge of types of vessels and their function, knowledge of maritime law, as well as experience in bargaining. To reduce the number of disputes and smooth the sale and purchase procedure, normally the ship-owner (seller) and the buyer will appoint brokers as middlemen to handle the transaction. There are three main stages for the sale and purchase of a ship:

1. the negotiation and contract stage
2. the inspection stage
3. the completion
