= Rubinstein bargaining model =

Model of a class of bargaining games

Rubinstein bargaining model refers to a class of bargaining games in game theory featuring alternating offers between two players over an infinite time horizon. The model addresses how rational agents divide a surplus when they have conflicting interests but mutual incentives to reach an agreement. The original solution concept was introduced by Ariel Rubinstein in his seminal 1982 paper.

Prior to Rubinstein's work, cooperative game theory approaches like the Nash bargaining solution provided normative benchmarks for surplus division based on axiomatic principles but did not model the strategic process of negotiation. Rubinstein's key innovation was to incorporate time preference (discounting) and the threat of perpetual disagreement into a non-cooperative framework, yielding a unique subgame perfect equilibrium that reflects the strategic behavior of agents over time.

In the model, the player who makes the first offer generally receives a larger share of the surplus, with the exact division determined by the players' discount factors. This first-mover advantage diminishes as players become more patient (i.e., as discount factors approach 1), leading the solution to converge to an equal split in the limit. Rubinstein's model has become one of the most influential findings in game theory, inspiring extensive literature on bargaining with incomplete information, multiple players, and various extensions, and providing theoretical foundations for understanding negotiation in economics, political science, and other fields.

== Requirements ==
A standard Rubinstein bargaining model has the following elements:

- Two players
- A Prize
- Complete information
- Unlimited offers—the game keeps going until one player accepts an offer
- Alternating offers—the first player makes an offer in the first period, if the second player rejects, the game moves to the second period in which the second player makes an offer, if the first rejects, the game moves to the third period, and so forth
- Delays are costly

== Solution ==
Consider the typical Rubinstein bargaining game in which two players decide how to divide a pie of size 1. An offer by a player takes the form x = (x_{1}, x_{2}) with x_{1} + x_{2} = 1 and $x_1,x_2 \geqslant 0$. Assume the players discount at the geometric rate of d, which can be interpreted as cost of delay or "pie spoiling". That is, 1 step later, the pie is worth d times what it was, for some d with 0<d<1.

Any x can be a Nash equilibrium outcome of this game, resulting from the following strategy profile: Player 1 always proposes x = (x_{1}, x_{2}) and only accepts offers x' where x_{1}' ≥ x_{1}. Player 2 always proposes x = (x_{1}, x_{2}) and only accepts offers x' where x_{2}' ≥ x_{2}.

In the above Nash equilibrium, player 2's threat to reject any offer less than x_{2} is not credible. In the subgame where player 1 did offer x_{2}' where x_{2} > x_{2}' > d x_{2}, clearly player 2's best response is to accept.

To derive a sufficient condition for subgame perfect equilibrium, let x = (x_{1}, x_{2}) and y = (y_{1}, y_{2}) be two divisions of the pie with the following property:

1. x_{2} = d y_{2}, and
2. y_{1} = d x_{1},

i.e.

1. x = (x_{1}, x_{2}), and
2. y = (d x_{1}, $\frac{1}{d}x_2$).

Consider the strategy profile where player 1 offers x and accepts no less than y_{1}, and player 2 offers y and accepts no less than x_{2}. Player 2 is now indifferent between accepting and rejecting, therefore the threat to reject lesser offers is now credible. Same applies to a subgame in which it is player 1's turn to decide whether to accept or reject. In this subgame perfect equilibrium, player 1 gets 1/(1+d) while player 2 gets d/(1+d). This subgame perfect equilibrium is essentially unique.

=== A Generalization ===
When the discount factor is different for the two players, $d_1$ for the first one and $d_2$ for the second, let us denote the value for the first player as $v(d_1, d_2)$. Then a reasoning similar to the above gives

$1-v(d_1, d_2) = d_2 \times v(d_2, d_1)$
$1-v(d_2, d_1) = d_1 \times v(d_1, d_2)$

yielding $v(d_1, d_2) = \frac{1 - d_2}{1 - d_1 d_2}$. This expression reduces to the original one for $d_1 = d_2 = d$.

== Desirability ==
Rubinstein bargaining has become pervasive in the literature because it has many desirable qualities:

- It has all the aforementioned requirements, which are thought to accurately simulate real-world bargaining.
- There is a unique solution.
- The solution is pretty clean, which wasn't necessarily expected given the game is infinite.
- There is no delay in the transaction.
- As both players become infinitely patient or can make counteroffers increasingly quickly (i.e. as d approaches 1), then both sides get half of the pie.
- The result quantifies the advantage of being the first to propose (and thus potentially avoiding the discount).
- The generalized result quantifies the advantage of being less pressed for time, i.e. of having a discount factor closer to 1 than that of the other party.
