= Kenneth Binmore =

English mathematician and game theorist (born 1940)

Kenneth George Binmore
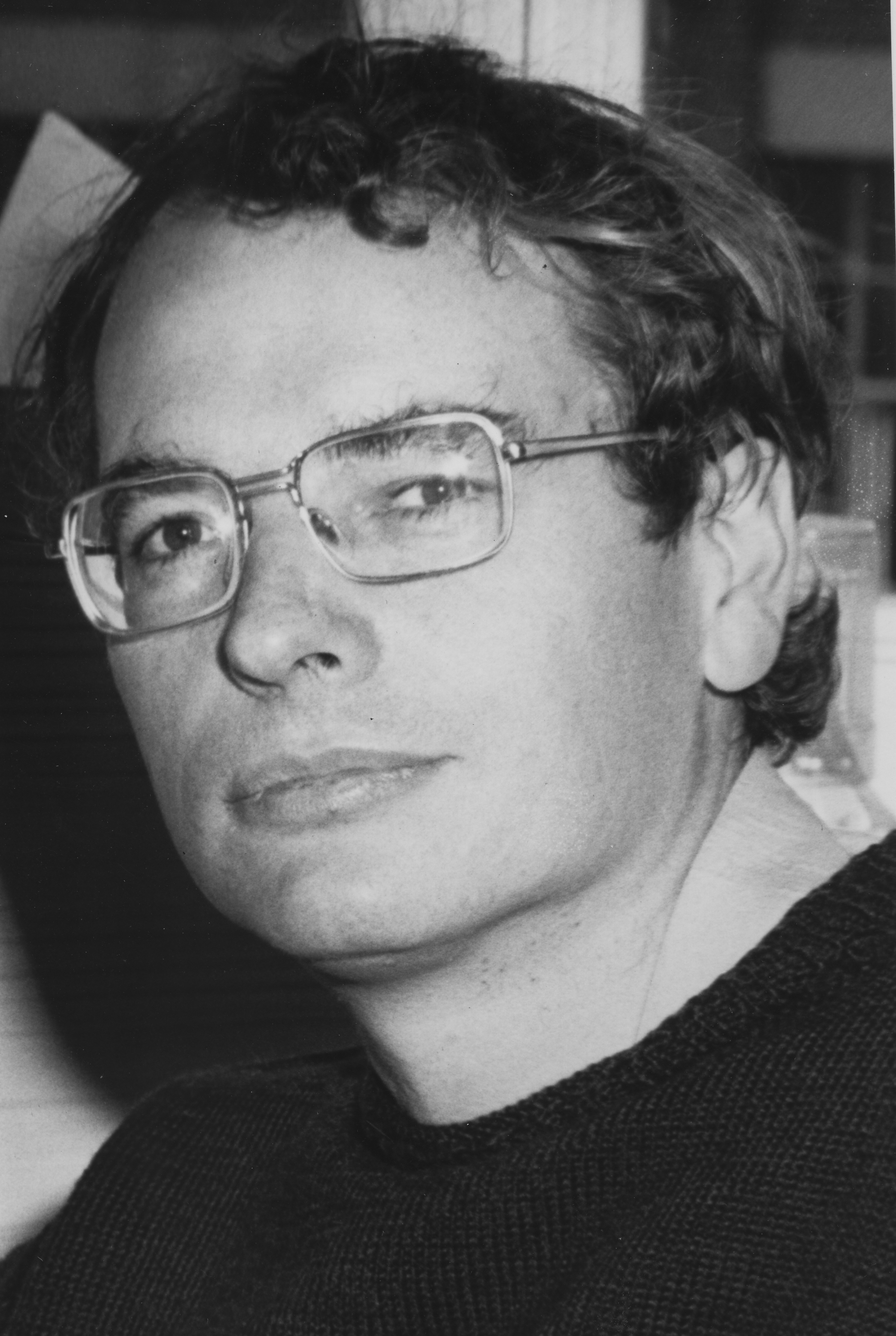
- Born: 27 September 1940 (age 86)

Education
- Education: Imperial College London

Philosophical work
- Era: 20th/21st-century philosophy
- Region: Western philosophy
- School: Analytic philosophy
- Institutions: University of Bristol; London School of Economics; University College London
- Main interests: Game theory; political philosophy; ethics; social contract theory; mathematical analysis

Kenneth George Binmore, CBE, FBA (born 27 September 1940) is an English mathematician, economist, and game theorist, a Professor Emeritus of Economics at University College London (UCL) and a Visiting Emeritus Professor of Economics at the University of Bristol. As a founder of modern economic theory of bargaining (with Nash and Rubinstein), he made important contributions to the foundations of game theory, experimental economics, evolutionary game theory and analytical philosophy. He took up economics after holding the Chair of Mathematics at the London School of Economics. The switch has put him at the forefront of developments in game theory. His other interests include political and moral philosophy, decision theory, and statistics. He has written over 100 scholarly papers and 14 books.

== Education ==
Binmore studied mathematics at Imperial College London, where he was awarded a 1st class-honours BSc with a Governor's Prize, and later a PhD in mathematical analysis.

== Research ==
Binmore's major research contributions are to the theory of bargaining and its testing in the laboratory. He is a pioneer of experimental economics. He began his experimental work in the 1980s when most economists thought that game theory would not work in the laboratory. Binmore and his collaborators established that game theory can often predict the behaviour of experienced players very well in laboratory settings, even in the case of human bargaining behaviour, a particularly challenging case for game theory. This has brought him into conflict with some proponents of behavioural economics who emphasise the importance of other-regarding or social preferences, and argue that their findings threaten traditional game theory.

Binmore's work in political and moral philosophy began in the 1980s when he first applied bargaining theory to John Rawls' original position. His search for the philosophical foundations of the original position took him first to Kant's works, and then to Hume. Hume inspired Binmore to contribute to a naturalistic science of morals that seeks foundations for Rawlsian ideas about fairness norms in biological and social evolution. The result was his two-volume Game Theory and the Social Contract, an ambitious attempt to lay the foundations for a genuine science of morals using the theory of games. In Game Theory and the Social Contract Binmore proposes a naturalistic reinterpretation of John Rawls' original position that reconciles his egalitarian theory of justice with John Harsanyi's utilitarian theory. His recent Natural Justice provides a nontechnical synthesis of this work.

== Affiliations ==
In 1995 Binmore became one of the founding directors of the Centre for Economic Learning and Social Evolution (ELSE), an interdisciplinary research centre involving economists, psychologists, anthropologists and mathematicians based at University College London. Funded by the Economic and Social Research Council, ELSE pursues basic research on evolutionary and learning approaches to games and society and applies its theoretical findings to practical problems in government and business.

While Director of ELSE, Binmore became widely known as the "poker-playing economic theorist", who netted the British government £22 billion when he led the team that designed the third-generation (3G) telecommunications auction in 2000. He went on to design and implement 3G spectrum auctions in Belgium, Denmark, Greece, Israel and Hong Kong.

Binmore is Emeritus Professor of Economics at University College London, Visiting Emeritus Professor of Economics at the University of Bristol and visiting professor in the Department of Philosophy, Logic and Scientific Method at the London School of Economics. He has held similar positions at the London School of Economics, Caltech, the University of Pennsylvania and the University of Michigan. He is a Fellow of the Econometric Society and the British Academy. He was appointed a CBE in the New Year's Honours List 2001 for contributions to game theory and to designing the UK 3G telecommunications auctions. He was elected a Foreign Honorary Member of the American Academy of Arts and Sciences in 2002. In 2007 he became an Honorary Research Fellow in the Department of Philosophy at the University of Bristol and an Honorary Fellow of the Centre for Philosophy at the London School of Economics.

== Books ==
- 1977: Mathematical Analysis: A Straightforward Approach. New York: Cambridge University Press
- 1980: Foundations of Analysis: Book 1: Logic, Sets and Numbers. Cambridge University Press
- 1980: Foundations of Analysis: Book 2: Topological Ideas. Cambridge University Press
- 1986: Economic Organizations As Games (co-ed. Partha Dasgupta). Basil Blackwell
- 1987: The Economics of Bargaining (co-ed. Partha Dasgupta). Basil Blackwell. Includes many of his early papers on Nash bargaining theory
- 1990: Essays on the Foundations of Game Theory. Basil Blackwell. Includes "Modelling Rational Players I and II" from Economics and Philosophy
- 1991: Fun and Games: A Text on Game Theory. D. C. Heath and Company
- 1994: Game Theory and the Social Contract, Volume 1: Playing Fair. Cambridge: MIT Press
- 1998: Game Theory and the Social Contract, Volume 2: Just Playing. Cambridge: MIT Press
- 2002: Calculus: Concepts and Methods (with Joan Davies). Cambridge University Press
- 2005: Natural Justice. New York: Oxford University Press
- 2007: Playing for Real – A Text on Game Theory. New York: Oxford University Press
- 2007: Does Game Theory Work? The Bargaining Challenge. MIT Press. Papers on bargaining experiments with comments on challenges to game theory posed by behavioural school of economics
- 2008: Game Theory: A Very Short Introduction. Oxford University Press. Mini-biographies of many founders of subject, including John Nash; overview of a cutting-edge field with successes in evolutionary biology, economics and other disciplines
- 2009: Rational Decisions. Princeton University Press. Explains foundations of Bayesian decision theory and why Leonard Savage restricted it to small worlds. Argues that Bayesian approach inadequate in a large world
- 2021: Imaginary philosophical dialogues : between sages down the ages. Cham: Springer.

== Selected articles ==
- With A. Rubinstein and A. Wolinsky, "The Nash Bargaining Solution in Economic Modeling", RAND Journal of Economics, 1986
- "Perfect Equilibria in Bargaining Models," in K. Binmore and P. Dasgupta, editors, The Economics of Bargaining, Basil Blackwell, Oxford, 1987
- "Modeling Rational Players I and II", Economics and Philosophy, 1987
- With A. Shaked and J. Sutton, "An Outside Option Experiment", Quarterly Journal of Economics, 1989
- "Debayesing Game Theory," in: B. Skyrms, editor, Studies in Logic and the Foundations of Game Theory: Proceedings of the Ninth International Congress of Logic, Methodology and the Philosophy of Science, Kluwer, Dordrecht, 1992
- With L. Samuelson, "Evolutionary Stability in Repeated Games Played by Finite Automata," Journal of Economic Theory, 57, 1992
- With J. Gale and L. Samuelson, "Learning to be Imperfect: The Ultimatum Game," Games and Economic Behavior, 8, 1995
- With L. Samuelson, "Muddling Through: Noisy Equilibrium Selection," Journal of Economic Theory, 74, 1997
- "Rationality and Backward Induction", Journal of Economic Methodology, 4, 1997
- With J. McCarthy, G. Ponti, A. Shaked and L. Samuelson, "A Backward Induction Experiment," Journal of Economic Theory, 104, 2002
- With P. Klemperer, "The Biggest Auction Ever: The Sale of the British 3G Telecom Licences," Economic Journal, 112, 2002
- With L. Samuelson, "The Evolution of Focal Points," Games and Economic Behavior, 55, 2006
- With A. Shaked, "Experimental Economics: Where Next?" Journal of Economic Behavior and Organization, 2009

== Interview with Binmore ==
"The Origin of Fairness" in Alex Voorhoeve Conversations on Ethics. Oxford University Press, 2009. ISBN 978-0-19-921537-9 Binmore's approach to moral philosophy
