= Effects bargaining =

Effects bargaining is a type of bargaining which involves certain decisions that are within the management’s right to make. This has impact on mandatory subjects of bargaining. This is common to some business decisions like laying off and transferring employees. The bargaining on these impacts or effects is called effects bargaining.

For example, a contract may give an employer the ability to integrate new technology however, if the new technology will have a significant impact on employment, the employer is required to give the union notice in advance to allow bargaining on the effects prior to the technology being put in place.
