= Cooperative bargaining =

Problem in process of sharing surplus

Cooperative bargaining is a process in which two people decide how to share a surplus that they can jointly generate. In many cases, the surplus created by the two players can be shared in many ways, forcing the players to negotiate which division of payoffs to choose. Such surplus-sharing problems (also called bargaining problem) are faced by management and labor in the division of a firm's profit, by trade partners in the specification of the terms of trade, and more.

The present article focuses on the normative approach to bargaining. It studies how the surplus should be shared, by formulating appealing axioms that the solution to a bargaining problem should satisfy. It is useful when both parties are willing to cooperate in implementing the fair solution. Such solutions, particularly the Nash solution, were used to solve concrete economic problems, such as management–labor conflicts, on numerous occasions.

An alternative approach to bargaining is the positive approach. It studies how the surplus is actually shared. Under the positive approach, the bargaining procedure is modeled as a non-cooperative game. The most common form of such game is called sequential bargaining.

== Formal description ==
A two-person bargain problem consists of:

- A feasibility set $F$, a closed subset of $\mathbb{R}^2$ that is often assumed to be convex, the elements of which are interpreted as agreements.
- A disagreement, or threat, point $d=(d_1, d_2)$, where $d_1$ and $d_2$ are the respective payoffs to player 1 and player 2, which they are guaranteed to receive if they cannot come to a mutual agreement.

The problem is nontrivial if agreements in $F$ are better for both parties than the disagreement point. A solution to the bargaining problem selects an agreement $\phi$ in $F$.

=== Feasibility set ===
The feasible agreements typically include all possible joint actions, leading to a feasibility set that includes all possible payoffs. Often, the feasible set is restricted to include only payoffs that have a possibility of being better than the disagreement point for both agents.

=== Disagreement point ===
The disagreement point $d$ is the value the players can expect to receive if negotiations break down. This could be some focal equilibrium that both players could expect to play, or zero if no agreement is reached. This point directly affects the bargaining solution, however, so it stands to reason that each player should attempt to choose his disagreement point in order to maximize his bargaining position. Towards this objective, it is often advantageous to increase one's own disagreement payoff while harming the opponent's disagreement payoff (hence the interpretation of the disagreement as a threat). If threats are viewed as actions, then one can construct a separate game wherein each player chooses a threat and receives a payoff according to the outcome of bargaining. It is known as Nash's variable threat game.

== Nash bargaining game ==
John Forbes Nash Jr. came up with the Nash bargaining solution. It is the unique solution to a two-person bargaining problem that satisfies the axioms of scale invariance, symmetry, efficiency, and independence of irrelevant alternatives. According to Paul Walker, Nash's bargaining solution was shown by John Harsanyi to be the same as Zeuthen's solution of the bargaining problem.

The Nash bargaining game is a simple two-player game used to model bargaining interactions. In the Nash bargaining game, two players demand a portion of some good (usually some amount of money). If the total amount requested by the players is less than that available, both players get their request. If their total request is greater than that available, neither player gets their request.

Nash (1953) presents a non-cooperative demand game with two players who are uncertain about which payoff pairs are feasible. In the limit as the uncertainty vanishes, equilibrium payoffs converge to those predicted by the Nash bargaining solution.

== Equilibrium analysis ==
Strategies are represented in the Nash demand game by a pair (x, y). x and y are selected from the interval [d, z], where d is the disagreement outcome and z is the total amount of good. If x + y is equal to or less than z, the first player receives x and the second y. Otherwise both get d; often $d=0$.

There are many Nash equilibria in the Nash demand game. Any x and y such that x + y = z is a Nash equilibrium. If either player increases their demand, both players receive nothing. If either reduces their demand they will receive less than if they had demanded x or y. There is also a Nash equilibrium where both players demand the entire good. Here both players receive nothing, but neither player can increase their return by unilaterally changing their strategy.

In Rubinstein's alternating offers bargaining game, players take turns acting as the proposer for splitting some surplus. The division of the surplus in the unique subgame perfect equilibrium depends upon how strongly players prefer current over future payoffs. In particular, let d be the discount factor, which refers to the rate at which players discount future earnings. That is, after each step the surplus is worth d times what it was worth previously. Rubinstein showed that if the surplus is normalized to 1, the payoff for player 1 in equilibrium is 1/(1+d), while the payoff for player 2 is d/(1+d). In the limit as players become perfectly patient, the equilibrium division converges to the Nash bargaining solution.

== Bargaining solutions ==
Various solutions have been proposed based on slightly different assumptions about what properties are desired for the final agreement point.

=== Nash bargaining solution ===
John Forbes Nash Jr. proposed that a solution should satisfy certain axioms:

1. Invariant to affine transformations or Invariant to equivalent utility representations
2. Pareto optimality
3. Independence of irrelevant alternatives
4. Symmetry

Nash proved that the solutions satisfying these axioms are exactly the points $(x,y)$ in $F$ which maximize the following expression:

$$(u(x)-u(d))(v(y)-v(d))$$

where u and v are the utility functions of Player 1 and Player 2, respectively, and d is a disagreement outcome. That is, players act as if they seek to maximize $(u(x)-u(d))(v(y)-v(d))$, where $u(d)$ and $v(d)$, are the status quo utilities (the utility obtained if one decides not to bargain with the other player). The product of the two excess utilities is generally referred to as the Nash product. Intuitively, the solution consists of each player getting their status quo payoff (i.e. noncooperative payoff) in addition to a share of the benefits occurring from cooperation.

=== Kalai–Smorodinsky bargaining solution ===
Independence of irrelevant alternatives can be substituted with a resource monotonicity axiom, as suggested by Ehud Kalai and Meir Smorodinsky. This leads to the Kalai–Smorodinsky rule, which selects the point which maintains the ratio of maximal gains. In other words, if we normalize the disagreement point to (0,0) and player 1 can receive a maximum of $g_1$ with player 2's help (and vice versa for $g_2$), then the Kalai–Smorodinsky bargaining solution would yield the point $\phi$ on the Pareto frontier such that $\phi_1 / \phi_2 = g_1 / g_2$ .

=== Egalitarian bargaining solution ===
The egalitarian bargaining solution, introduced by Ehud Kalai, is a third solution which drops the condition of scale invariance while including both the axiom of independence of irrelevant alternatives, and the axiom of resource monotonicity. Under these conditions the solution attempts to grant equal gain to both parties. In other words, it is the point which maximizes the minimum payoff among players. Kalai notes that this solution is closely related to the egalitarian ideas of John Rawls.

=== Comparison table ===
Name	Pareto-optimality	Symmetry	Scale-invariance	Irrelevant-independence	Resource-monotonicity	Principle
Proportional-fair rule	Yes	Yes	Yes	Yes	No	Maximizing the product of surplus utilities
Kalai–Smorodinsky rule	Yes	Yes	Yes	No	Yes	Equalizing the ratios of maximal gains
Egalitarian rule	Yes	Yes	No	Yes	Yes	Maximizing the minimum of surplus utilities

== Experimental solutions ==
A series of experimental studies found no consistent support for any of the bargaining models. Although some participants reached results similar to those of the models, others did not, focusing instead on conceptually easy solutions beneficial to both parties. The Nash equilibrium was the most common agreement (mode), but the average (mean) agreement was closer to a point based on expected utility. In real-world negotiations, participants often first search for a general bargaining formula, and then only work out the details of such an arrangement, thus precluding the disagreement point and instead moving the focal point to the worst possible agreement.

== Applications ==
Kenneth Binmore has used the Nash bargaining game to explain the emergence of human attitudes toward distributive justice. He primarily uses evolutionary game theory to explain how individuals come to believe that proposing a 50–50 split is the only just solution to the Nash bargaining game. Herbert Gintis supports a similar theory, holding that humans have evolved to a predisposition for strong reciprocity but do not necessarily make decisions based on direct consideration of utility.

== Bargaining solutions and risk-aversion ==
Some economists have studied the effects of risk aversion on the bargaining solution. Compare two similar bargaining problems A and B, where the feasible space and the utility of player 1 remain fixed, but the utility of player 2 is different: player 2 is more risk-averse in A than in B. Then, the payoff of player 2 in the Nash bargaining solution is smaller in A than in B. However, this is true only if the outcome itself is certain; if the outcome is risky, then a risk-averse player may get a better deal as proved by Alvin E. Roth and Uriel Rothblum.

== See also ==
- Bargaining
- Core (game theory)
- Rubinstein bargaining model
- Sequential bargaining
- Nash equilibrium
- Ultimatum game
