= Resource monotonicity =

Mathematical principle

Resource monotonicity (RM; aka aggregate monotonicity) is a principle of fair division. It says that, if there are more resources to share, then all agents should be weakly better off; no agent should lose from the increase in resources. The RM principle has been studied in various division problems.

== Allocating divisible resources ==
=== Single homogeneous resource, general utilities ===
Suppose society has $m$ units of some homogeneous divisible resource, such as water or flour. The resource should be divided among $n$ agents with different utilities. The utility of agent $i$ is represented by a function $u_i$; when agent $i$ receives $y_i$ units of resource, he derives from it a utility of $u_i(y_i)$. Society has to decide how to divide the resource among the agents, i.e., to find a vector $y_1,\dots,y_n$ such that: $y_1+\cdots+y_n = m$.

Two classic allocation rules are the egalitarian rule - aiming to equalize the utilities of all agents (equivalently: maximize the minimum utility), and the utilitarian rule - aiming to maximize the sum of utilities.

The egalitarian rule is always RM: when there is more resource to share, the minimum utility that can be guaranteed to all agents increases, and all agents equally share the increase. In contrast, the utilitarian rule might be not RM.

For example, suppose there are two agents, Alice and Bob, with the following utilities:

- $u_A(y_A) = y_A^2$
- $u_B(y_B) = y_B$

The egalitarian allocation is found by solving the equation: $y_A^2=(m-y_A)$, which is equivalent to $m=y_A^2+y_A$, so $y_A$ is monotonically increasing with $m$. An equivalent equation is: $y_B=(m-y_B)^2$, which is equivalent to $m=\sqrt{y_B}+y_B$, so $y_B$ too is monotonically increasing with $m$. So in this example (as always) the egalitarian rule is RM.

In contrast, the utilitarian rule is not RM. This is because Alice has increasing returns: her marginal utility is small when she has few resources, but it increases fast when she has many resources. Hence, when the total amount of resource is small (specifically, $m<1$), the utilitarian sum is maximized when all resources are given to Bob; but when there are many resources ($m>1$), the maximum is attained when all resources are given to Alice. Mathematically, if $y$ is the amount given to Alice, then the utilitarian sum is $y^2 + (m-y)$. This function has only an internal minimum point but not an internal maximum point; its maximum point in the range $[0,m]$ is attained in one of the endpoints. It is the left endpoint when $m<1$ and the right endpoint when $m>1$. In general, the utilitarian allocation rule is RM when all agents have diminishing returns, but it may be not RM when some agents have increasing returns (as in the example).

Thus, if society uses the utilitarian rule to allocate resources, then Bob loses value when the amount of resources increases. This is bad because it gives Bob an incentive against economic growth: Bob will try to keep the total amount small in order to keep his own share large.

=== Two complementary resources, Leontief utilities ===
Consider a cloud server with some units of RAM and CPU. There are two users with different types of tasks:

- The tasks of Alice need 1 unit of RAM and 2 units of CPU;
- The tasks of Bob need 2 units of RAM and 1 unit of CPU.

Thus, the utility functions (=number of tasks), denoting RAM by r and CPU by c, are Leontief utilities:

- $u_A(r,c)=\min(r,c/2)$
- $u_B(r,c)=\min(r/2,c)$

If the server has 12 RAM and 12 CPU, then both the utilitarian and the egalitarian allocations (and also the Nash-optimal, max-product allocation) are:

- $r_A=4, c_A=8 \implies u_A=4$
- $r_B=8, c_B=4 \implies u_B=4$

Now, suppose 12 more units of CPU become available. The egalitarian allocation does not change, but the utilitarian allocation now gives all resources to Alice:

- $r_A=12, c_A=24 \implies u_A=12$
- $r_B=0, c_B=0 \implies u_B=0$

so Bob loses value from the increase in resources.

The Nash-optimal (max-product) allocation becomes:

- $r_A=6, c_A=12 \implies u_A=6$
- $r_B=6, c_B=3 \implies u_B=3$

so Bob loses value here too, but the loss is less severe.

=== Cake cutting, additive utilities ===
In the fair cake-cutting problem, classic allocation rules such as divide and choose are not RM. Several rules are known to be RM:

- When the pieces may be disconnected, any allocation rule maximizing a concave welfare function of the absolute (not normalized) utilities is RM. In particular, the Nash-optimal rule, absolute-leximin rule and absolute-utilitarian rule are all RM. However, if the maximization uses the relative utilities (utilities divided by total cake value) then most of these rules are not RM; the only one that remains RM is the Nash-optimal rule.
- When the pieces must be connected, no Pareto-optimal proportional division rule is RM. The absolute-equitable rule is weakly Pareto-optimal and RM, but not proportional. The relative-equitable rule is weakly Pareto-optimal and proportional, but not RM. The so-called rightmost mark rule, which is an variant of divide-and-choose, is proportional, weakly Pareto-optimal and RM - but it works only for two agents. It is an open question whether there exist division procedures that are both proportional and RM for three or more agents.

=== Single-peaked preferences ===
Resource-monotonicity was studied in problems of fair division with single-peaked preferences.

== Allocating discrete items ==
=== Identical items, general utilities ===
The egalitarian rule (maximizing the leximin vector of utilities) might be not RM when the resource to divide consists of several indivisible (discrete) units.

For example, suppose there are $m$ tennis rackets. Alice gets a utility of 1 whenever she has a racket, since she enjoys playing against the wall. But Bob and Carl get a utility of 1 only when they have two rackets, since they only enjoy playing against each other or against Alice. Hence, if there is only one racket, the egalitarian rule gives it entirely to Alice. But if there are two rackets, they are divided equally between the agents (each agent gets a racket for 2/3 of the time). Hence, Alice loses utility when the total amount of rackets increases. Alice has an incentive to oppose growth.

=== Different items, additive utilities ===
In the fair item allocation problem, classic allocation procedures such as adjusted winner and envy-graph are not RM. Moreover, even the Nash-optimal rule, which is RM in cake-cutting, is not RM in item allocation. In contrast, round-robin item allocation is RM. Moreover, round-robin can be adapted to yield picking sequences appropriate for agents with different entitlements; all these picking sequences are RM too.

=== Identical items, additive utilities ===
The special case in which all items are identical and each agent's utility is simply the number of items he receives is known as apportionment. It originated from the task of allocating seats in a parliament among states or among parties. Therefore, it is often called house monotonicity.

== Facility location ==
Facility location is the social choice question is where a certain facility should be located. Consider the following network of roads, where the letters denote junctions and the numbers denote distances:

A---6---B--5--C--5--D---6---E

The population is distributed uniformly along the roads. People want to be as close as possible to the facility, so they have "dis-utility" (negative utility) measured by their distance to the facility.

In the initial situation, the egalitarian rule locates the facility at C, since it minimizes the maximum distance to the facility, which is 11 (the utilitarian and Nash rules also locate the facility at C).

Now, there is a new junction X and some new roads (the previous roads do not change):

B--3--X--3--D
..........|.........
..........4.........
..........|.........
..........C.........

The egalitarian rule now locates the facility at X, since it allows to decrease the maximum distance from 11 to 9 (the utilitarian and Nash rules also locate the facility at X).

The increase in resources helped most people, but decreased the utility of those living in or near C.

== Bargaining ==
A monotonicity axiom closely related to resource-monotonicity appeared first in the context of the bargaining problem. A bargaining problem is defined by a set of alternatives; a bargaining solution should select a single alternative from the set, subject to some axioms. The resource-monotonicity axiom was presented in two variants:

1. "If, for every utility level that player 1 may demand, the maximum feasible utility level that player 2 can simultaneously reach is increased, then the utility level assigned to player 2 according to the solution should also be increased". This axiom leads to a characterization of the Kalai–Smorodinsky bargaining solution.
2. "Let T and S be bargaining games; if T contains S then for all agents, the utility in T is weakly larger than the utility in S". In other words, if the set of alternatives grows, the selected solution should be at least as good for all agents as the previous solution. This axiom, in addition to Pareto optimality and symmetry and Independence of irrelevant alternatives, leads to a characterization of the egalitarian bargaining solution.

== See also ==
- Throw away paradox
