= Frederik Zeuthen =

Danish economist and mathematician

Frederik L. B. Zeuthen
- Born: 9 September 1888; Copenhagen, Denmark
- Died: 24 February 1959 (aged 70); Copenhagen, Denmark
- Spouse: Else Zeuthen
- Father: Hieronymus Georg Zeuthen

Academic background
- Education: University of Copenhagen

Academic work
- Institutions: University of Copenhagen
- Doctoral students: Hans Brems

Frederik Ludvig Bang Zeuthen (9 September 1888 – 24 February 1959) was a Danish economist. He became an internationally recognized economist in the 1930s and published his research in English, French and German, as well as Danish. He was especially known for his theoretical microeconomics work in general equilibrium theory and the theories of market influences and pricing. He was one of the pioneers of the mathematical theory of monopolistic competition. At the same time, he was interested in social policy and distribution of income.

== Background and career ==
Zeuthen's father was the mathematician Hieronymus Georg Zeuthen. Frederik attended Østre Borgerdyd Gymnasium and then studied economics at the University of Copenhagen. His teachers Lauritz Vilhelm Birck and Harald Ludvig Westergaard inspired him to do research in economics. After working for some years outside of academe, Zeuthen earned in 1928 a doctorate with a dissertation Den Økonomiske Fordeling (The Economic Distribution) on price formation. He was appointed a professor in economics in 1930—a position he held until retiring in 1958. He died the following year at age 70.

== Economic research ==
Zeuthen's book Problems of Monopoly and Economic Warfare, published in London in 1930 with a foreword by the economist Joseph Schumpeter, established for Zeuthen an international reputation among economists. Internationally, the term Zeuthen strategy is still used for a particular negotiation strategy studied in game theory. Zeuthen's article Das Prinzip der Knappheit, technische Kombination und Ökonomische Qualität (The principle of scarcity, technical combination and economic quality), published in the Austrian Zeitschrift für Nationalökonomie in 1933, was ground-breaking, as the article presented the first formulation using mathematical inequalities for Léon Walras's general theory of economic equilibrium.

However, Frederik Zeuthen's main theoretical work was his book Økonomisk Teori og Metode, published in 1942 followed by English translation published in 1955 as Economic Theory and Method. The books deals mainly with microeconomics and includes, inter alia, what became an internationally influential mathematical relationship between the prices of production factors and finished goods.

== Zeuthen Prize ==
In his will, Frederik Zeuthen endowed the association "Socialøkonomisk Samfund" (Socioeconomic Society), which he had chaired in 1915–1917. The association has established a scholarship annually awarding the Zeuthen Prize for the best article written on the basis of a master's thesis submitted to the Economics Department at the University of Copenhagen.

== Zeuthen Lectures ==
Since 1996 the Economics Department at University of Copenhagen has provided a lecture series (from 1996 to 2008 annually and since 2008 every two years) called the "Zeuthen Lectures". For the lecture series, an internationally recognized economist is invited to hold a lecture series about his or her field of research. Past lecturers have included several Nobel prize winners in economics. Some of the lectures have been published in book form in the "Zeuther Lectures Book Series" from MIT Press.
