= Throw away paradox =

In economics, the throw away paradox is a situation in which a person can gain by throwing away some of his property. It was first described by Robert J. Aumann and B. Peleg as a note on a similar paradox by David Gale.

== Description ==
There is an economy with two commodities (x and y) and two traders (e.g. Alice and Bob).

- In one situation, the initial endowments are (20,0) and (0,10), i.e., Alice has twenty units of commodity x and Bob has ten units of commodity y. Then, the market opens for trade. In equilibrium, Alice's bundle is (4,2), i.e., she has four units of x and two units of y.
- In the second situation, Alice decides to discard half of her initial endowment - she throws away 10 units of commodity x. Then, the market opens for trade. In equilibrium, Alice's bundle is (5,5) - she has more of every commodity than in the first situation.

== Details ==
The paradox happens in the following situation. Both traders have the same utility function with the following characteristics:

- It is a homothetic utility function.
- The slope of the indifference curves at $(y,y)$ is -1.
- The slope of the indifference curves at $(2y,y)$ is -1/8.

One such function is $u(x,y)=\frac{1}{(x+ay)^{-3}+(ax+y)^{-3}}$, where $a$ is a certain parameter between 0 and 1, but many other such functions exist.

The explanation for the paradox is that when the quantity of x decreases, its price increases, and the increase in price is more than sufficient to compensate Alice for the decrease in quantity.

== See also ==
- Paradox of Plenty
- Resource monotonicity
