= Larry Samuelson =

- Born: April 2, 1953 (age 73)

Academic background
- Education: University of Illinois
- Doctoral advisor: Hans Brems
- Website: Information at IDEAS / RePEc

Larry Samuelson (born April 2, 1953) is the A. Douglas Melamed Professor of Economics at Yale University and one of the faculty of the Cowles Foundation of Yale University.

Samuelson earned his B.A. in economics/political science from the University of Illinois in 1974. He continued on with the University of Illinois for both his master's degree in 1977 and his PhD in 1978—both in economics.

He has previously held faculty positions at the University of Florida, Syracuse University, Penn State and the University of Wisconsin.

He has made significant contributions to microeconomic theory and game theory. Areas of specialization include the theory of repeated games and the evolutionary foundations of economic behavior.

Samuelson has served on the editorial boards of Games and Economic Behavior, the International Journal of Game Theory, Economic Theory, the Journal of Economic Theory, Theoretical Economics, the Journal of Economic Literature, and Econometrica. He has served as a co-editor of Econometrica and the American Economic Review.
