= Zeuthen strategy =

Negotiation strategy

The Zeuthen strategy in cognitive science is a negotiation strategy used by some artificial agents. Its purpose is to measure the willingness to risk conflict. An agent will be more willing to risk conflict if it does not have much to lose in case that the negotiation fails. In contrast, an agent is less willing to risk conflict when it has more to lose. The value of a deal is expressed in its utility. An agent has much to lose when the difference between the utility of its current proposal and the conflict deal is high.

When both agents use the monotonic concession protocol, the Zeuthen strategy leads them to agree upon a deal in the negotiation set. This set consists of all conflict free deals, which are individually rational and Pareto optimal, and the conflict deal, which maximizes the Nash product.

The strategy was introduced in 1930 by the Danish economist Frederik Zeuthen.

== Three key questions ==
The Zeuthen strategy answers three open questions that arise when using the monotonic concession protocol, namely:

1. Which deal should be proposed at first?
2. On any given round, who should concede?
3. In case of a concession, how much should the agent concede?

The answer to the first question is that any agent should start with its most preferred deal, because that deal has the highest utility for that agent. The second answer is that the agent with the smallest value of Risk(i,t) concedes, because the agent with the lowest utility for the conflict deal profits most from avoiding conflict. To the third question, the Zeuthen strategy suggests that the conceding agent should concede just enough raise its value of Risk(i,t) just above that of the other agent. This prevents the conceding agent to have to concede again in the next round.

== Risk ==
$$\text{Risk}(i,t)=
\begin{cases}
1 & U_{i}(\delta(i,t))=0 \\
\frac{U_{i}(\delta(i,t))-U_{i}(\delta(j,t))}{U_{i}(\delta(i,t))} & \text{otherwise}
\end{cases}$$

Risk(i,t) is a measurement of agent i's willingness to risk conflict. The risk function formalizes the notion that an agent's willingness to risk conflict is the ratio of the utility that agent would lose by accepting the other agent's proposal to the utility that agent would lose by causing a conflict. Agent i is said to be using a rational negotiation strategy if at any step t + 1 that agent i sticks to his last proposal, Risk(i,t) > Risk(j,t).

== Sufficient concession ==
If agent i makes a sufficient concession in the next step, then, assuming that agent j is using a rational negotiation strategy, if agent j does not concede in the next step, he must do so in the step after that. The set of all sufficient concessions of agent i at step t is denoted SC(i, t).

== Minimal sufficient concession ==
$$\delta'=\arg\max_{\delta\in{SC(A,t)}}\{U_{A}(\delta)\}$$

is the minimal sufficient concession of agent A in step t.

Agent A begins the negotiation by proposing

$$\delta(A,0)=\arg\max_{\delta\in{NS}}U_{A}(\delta)$$

and will make the minimal sufficient concession in step t + 1 if and only if Risk(A,t) ≤ Risk(B,t).

Theorem If both agents are using Zeuthen strategies, then they will agree on

$$\delta=\arg\max_{\delta'\in{NS}}\{\pi(\delta')\},$$

that is, the deal which maximizes the Nash product.

Proof Let δ_{A} = δ(A,t). Let δ_{B} = δ(B,t). According to the Zeuthen strategy, agent A will concede at step $t$ if and only if

$$Risk(A,t)\leq Risk(B,t).$$

That is, if and only if

$$\frac{U_{A}(\delta_{A})-U_{A}(\delta_{B})}{U_{A}(\delta_{A})}\leq \frac{U_{B}(\delta_{B})-U_{B}(\delta_{A})}{U_{B}(\delta_{B})}$$

$$U_{B}(\delta_{B})(U_{A}(\delta_{A})-U_{A}(\delta_{B}))\leq
U_{A}(\delta_{A})(U_{B}(\delta_{B})-U_{B}(\delta_{A}))$$

$$U_{A}(\delta_{A})U_{B}(\delta_{B})-U_{A}(\delta_{B})U_{B}(\delta_{B})\leq
U_{A}(\delta_{A})U_{B}(\delta_{B})-U_{A}(\delta_{A})U_{B}(\delta_{A})$$

$$-U_{A}(\delta_{B})U_{B}(\delta_{B})\leq -U_{A}(\delta_{A})U_{B}(\delta_{A})$$

$$U_{A}(\delta_{A}) U_{B}(\delta_{A})\leq U_{A}(\delta_{B}) U_{B}(\delta_{B})$$

$$\pi(\delta_{A})\leq \pi(\delta_{B})$$

Thus, Agent A will concede if and only if $\delta_{A}$ does not yield the larger product of utilities.

Therefore, the Zeuthen strategy guarantees a final agreement that maximizes the Nash Product.
