= Ariel Rubinstein =

Israeli economist

- אריאל רובינשטיין
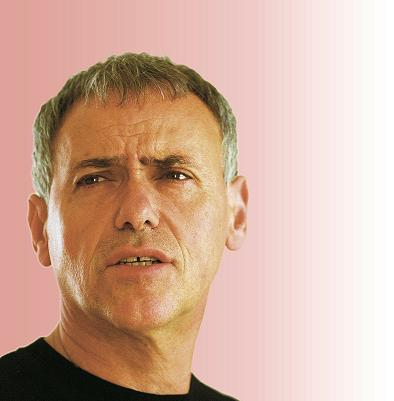
- Born: April 13, 1951 (age 75); Jerusalem, Israel
- Education: Hebrew University (PhD, 1979)
- Occupation: Economist
- Employer: Tel Aviv University
- Known for: Economic Theory

Ariel Rubinstein (Hebrew: אריאל רובינשטיין; born April 13, 1951) is a Professor Emeritus of Economics at Tel Aviv University and a Professor of Economics at New York University. His primary research focuses on economic theory, specifically game theory, bounded rationality, choice theory, economics and language, and experimental economics.

Rubinstein is a recipient of the Israel Prize (2002), a member of the Israel Academy of Sciences and Humanities, and a foreign member of the American Academy of Arts and Sciences and the British Academy.

Politically, Rubinstein holds a left-wing Zionist worldview, which he frequently expresses in his publicistic writing.

== Biography ==
Rubinstein was born in 1951 in the Tel Arza neighborhood of Jerusalem. His parents, Leah and Yehuda, immigrated to Israel from Białystok in the 1930s. His sister was the musician Bat-Sheva Rubinstein.

He attended the Sokolov and Beit HaYeled schools and later graduated from the Hebrew University Secondary School. He served as an officer in the Artillery Corps. In 1971, he began his studies at the Hebrew University of Jerusalem, completing a B.A. in Mathematics, Economics, and Statistics (1974). He earned an M.A. in Economics (1975) under Menahem Yaari and an M.Sc. in Mathematics (1976) under Bezalel Peleg. In 1979, he was awarded a PhD in Economics, also supervised by Menahem Yaari.

After postdoctoral fellowships at Nuffield College and Bell Labs, he joined the faculty of the Hebrew University in 1981, becoming a full professor in 1985. In 1990, he moved to the School of Economics at Tel Aviv University, where he became Professor Emeritus in 2019. Concurrently, he held partial appointments at Princeton University (1990–2003) and New York University (since 2003).

His major honors include the Israel Prize in Economics (2002), the Nemmers Prize in Economics (2004), the EMET Prize (2006), and serving as the President of the Econometric Society (2004).

He was a co-founder of the "Movement for Another Zionism" and one of the initiators of the "Officers' Letter" (1978) and Peace Now. He was married to Yael Rubinstein, a former Israeli ambassador, and has two children, Michal and Yuval.

== Academic Work ==
Rubinstein views models of economic theory as fables and believes they should be evaluated as such. He is skeptical of using economic theory as a definitive basis for predictions or policy recommendations. He argues that while theory can clarify thinking, its principles are not necessarily prescriptions for reality:

"Economics studies can, at most, encourage systematic thinking about social and economic problems, but they cannot provide solutions... there are no professionals with solutions to society's current problems, but there are plenty of charlatans waiting for the call."

He believes that one should not rush to apply economic theory to the moral decisions of everyday life:

"The rapid and assertive leap from abstract discussion to concrete problems is the greatest danger in using concepts derived from the academic ivory tower. When dealing with political issues, it is doubtful whether an appeal to academic theory is superior to the wisdom of the 'man on the street'."

Rubinstein has made contributions to a vast number of fields in economic theory, as follows:

=== Game Theory ===
- Bargaining Theory: Rubinstein's most famous paper presents a strategic model of bargaining, which serves as a development of the work of Nobel Laureate John Forbes Nash Jr.. The relationship between Rubinstein's model and the Nash bargaining model was analyzed in two subsequent papers.
- Repeated Games: Alongside Nobel Laureates Robert Aumann and Lloyd Shapley, Rubinstein analyzed perfect equilibrium in repeated game models with players using "limit of means" or "overtaking" criteria, proving what is known as the Perfect Folk Theorem.
- The Email Game: His paper demonstrates that a game with incomplete information, where players have "almost common knowledge," can differ significantly from a game with actual Common Knowledge (CK). This paradoxical idea has been utilized in game theory as a method for equilibrium selection in an approach called Global Games.

=== Bounded Rationality ===
Rubinstein was among the first to build economic models where participants engage in decision procedures that are inconsistent with the "Rational Agent" model. His primary contributions in this field include:

- Repeated Games with Finite Automata: His paper was a pioneer in analyzing repeated games where players do not only seek to maximize utility but also strive to minimize the complexity of the strategies they employ.
- Choice Procedures: An example of his work on choice procedures is his study of decision-making under uncertainty using the concept of similarity.
- Mechanism Design: Together with Jacob Glazer, Rubinstein built unique models where a designer attempts to achieve a desired outcome by exploiting the cognitive limitations of the players.
- Imperfect Memory: In a paper with Michele Piccione, the two conceived the Absent Driver Paradox: A driver traveling a road with two exits wishes to exit at the second one, but knows that upon reaching an intersection, he will not remember whether he is at the first or second exit. The analysis demonstrates the paradoxical nature of decision-making with imperfect memory.
- Equilibrium with Sampling: Alongside Martin Osborne, they introduced a game-theoretic solution based on the assumption that players sample each of their available strategies and choose the one that performed best in the sample. This new equilibrium exhibits properties (such as the use of dominated strategies) that are not possible in conventional game theory.

=== Market Models ===
- Bargaining and Markets: Together with Asher Wolinsky, Rubinstein built market models where buyers and sellers meet randomly and bargain under the shadow of the ability to return and bargain with others. The outcome of this process differs fundamentally from the predictions of competitive equilibrium.
- Jungle Economics: In a work with Michele Piccione, the two presented a model where the outcome of economic interaction results from the power dynamics between players.
- Economics Without Prices and Without Games: In recent years, Rubinstein has focused on building market models outside the frameworks of competitive equilibrium or game theory. These works, mostly done with Michael Richter, were summarized in their book No Prices, No Games! (Four Economic Models).

=== Experimental Economics ===
His experimental work began with a collaboration with Amos Tversky on the Hide and Seek Game and continued through a didactic website he established in 2002. Rubinstein was a pioneer in emphasizing the importance of measuring response time to interpret participant behavior in economic experiments.

=== Other Topics ===
- Economics and Language: Rubinstein emphasized the value of adding linguistic elements to economic models, summarized in his book Economics and Language.
- Social Choice Theory: How individual preferences can be unified into a single group decision.
- Economics and Law: Rubinstein wrote his doctoral dissertation in this field. For example, he analyzed optimal punishment in cases where an individual faces a sequential choice problem and may cause a negative outcome inadvertently.

== Social and Political Activity ==
Rubinstein is a prominent voice on social justice. For over a decade, he led a group of faculty at Tel Aviv University that successfully campaigned for the rights and improved conditions of contract workers.

A long-time peace activist, he has been vocal against the settlement enterprise in the West Bank. In 2002, he expressed support for conscientious objectors, calling them "the Guardians of the Walls of the Jewish conscience." In 2015, he published an article explaining why the Holocaust Remembrance Day has to be canceled; in 2025, he published an article titled "Why I Will Not Stand Still on Holocaust Remembrance Day," critiquing the nationalistic uses of the day.

In the summer of 2025, he organized a petition among Israeli academics calling for an end to the "starvation policy and the destruction of Gaza cities," urging others not to cooperate with such policies.

In matters of social justice, for about a decade he headed a group of lecturers at Tel Aviv University who addressed the problem of unfair employment of contract workers and achieved improvements in their employment conditions. Rubinstein expressed social-democratic views, for example in his criticism of the employment conditions of contract workers, the problem of wealth, and against the special status of economics professors in public discourse.

== The "Atlas of Cafes Where One Can Think" ==
Rubinstein maintains a unique project called the Atlas of Cafes Where One Can Think. This online map features approximately 750 cafes worldwide where he believes the environment is conducive to thinking (regardless of the quality of the coffee). Since 2006, he has collaborated with typographer Yanek Iontef to produce posters featuring photographs of these cafes, distributed for free.

== Publications ==
Ariel Rubinstein has published about 110 articles and eight books (all of his books are freely downloadable from his homepage):

- Bargaining and Markets, with M. Osborne, Academic Press, 1990.
- A Course in Game Theory, with M. Osborne, MIT Press, 1994.
- Modeling Bounded Rationality, MIT Press, 1998.
- Economics and Language, Cambridge University Press, 2000.
- Lecture Notes in Microeconomic Theory: The Economic Agent, Princeton University Press, 2005.
- Economic Fables, OpenBook Publishers, 2012.
- Models of Microeconomic Theory, with M. Osborne, Open Book Publishers, 2020.
- No Prices No Games, with M. Richter, Open Book Publishers, 2024.

== See also ==
- List of Israel Prize recipients
