= Else Zeuthen =

Danish peace activist and politician (1897–1975)

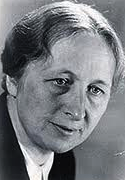
Else Zeuthen

Else Marie Zeuthen née Bengtsson (1897–1975) was a Danish peace activist and feminist. In the 1950s, she represented the Danish Social Liberal Party as a member of the Folketing. From 1941 to 1953, she headed the Danish branch of the Women's International League for Peace and Freedom and was president of the international organization from 1956 to 1965. Zeuthen opposed Denmark's membership of NATO. She contributed to creating a Danish network of associations and institutions able to collaborate with similar organisations at the international level.

== Early life, family and education ==
Born in the Frederiksberg district of Copenhagen on 10 October 1897, Else Marie Bengtsson was the daughter of the teacher Svend Otto Bengtsson (1871–1956) and his wife Elise Marie née Lassen (1873–1956). In 1915, she matriculated from Marie Kruse's School and earned a master's degree in English from the University of Copenhagen in 1921. In November 1924, she married the economics professor Frederik Ludvig Bang Zeuthen (1888–1959). They had no children.

== Career ==
In 1919, while still a student, Zeuthen was a co-founder of the social science journal Socialvirke (Social Work). On graduating, she became a tutor, translator, and from 1929 to 1935, a teaching assistant at the university. She chaired Kvindelig Læseforening (Women's Reading Association) from 1935 to 1945. Her main interest was however international cooperation on peace. After serving on Danske Kvinders Fredskæde, the Danish branch of the Women's International League for Peace and Freedom (WILPF), in 1935 she became a board member of the central organization and headed the Danish chapter from 1941 until 1953 when she resigned after becoming a member of the Folketing. She supported the WILPF throughout the German occupation.

As a member of the Folketing, representing the Danish Social Liberal Party, she focused on social issues, including international relations such as membership of the United Nations and problems in developing countries. In accordance with the party line, she opposed Denmark's entry into NATO.

Zeuthen continued to serve on the central WILPF board from 1946, becoming international chairman from 1956 to 1965.

Else Zeuthen died in Rungsted or 27 December 1975 and was buried in Hellebæk.

== See also ==
- List of peace activists
