= Bargaining =

Negotiation between a buyer and seller over the price and nature of their transaction

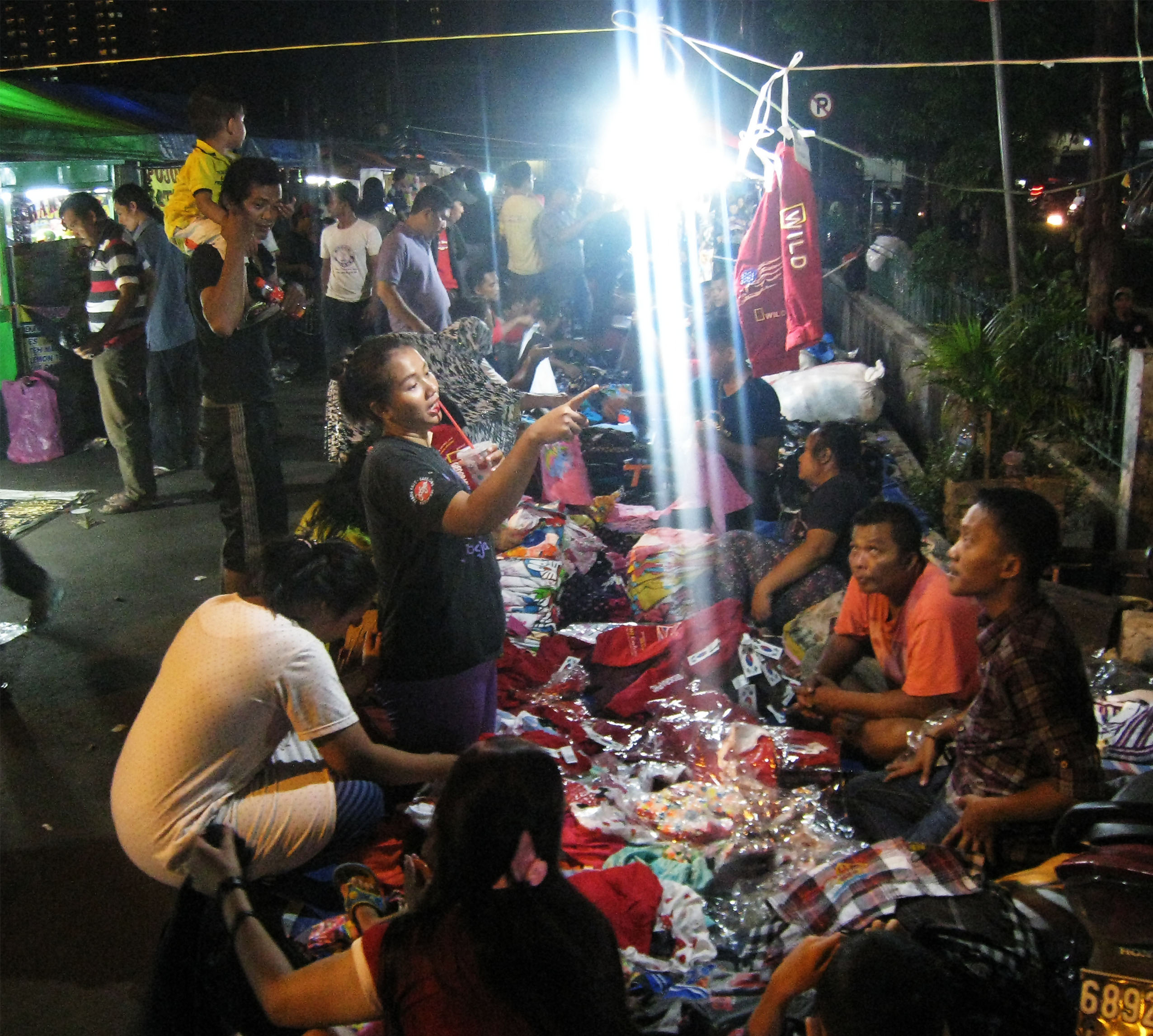
People bargaining in a traditional Indonesian pasar malam (night market) in Rawasari, Central Jakarta.

In the social sciences, bargaining or haggling is a type of negotiation in which the buyer and seller of a good or service debate the price or nature of a transaction. If the bargaining produces agreement on terms, the transaction takes place. It is often commonplace in poorer countries, or poorer localities within any specific country. Haggling can mostly be seen within street markets worldwide, wherein there remains no guarantee of the origin and authenticity of available products. Many people attribute it as a skill, but there remains no guarantee that the price put forth by the buyer would be acknowledged by the seller, resulting in losses of profit and even turnover in some cases. A growth in the country's GDP Per Capita Income is bound to reduce both the ill-effects of bargaining and the unscrupulous practices undertaken by vendors at street markets.

Although the most apparent aspect of bargaining in markets is as an alternative pricing strategy to fixed prices, it can also include making arrangements for credit or bulk purchasing, as well as serving as an important method of clienteling.

Bargaining has largely disappeared in parts of the world where retail stores with fixed prices are the most common place to purchase goods. However, for expensive goods such as homes, antiques and collectibles, jewellery and automobiles, bargaining can remain commonplace.

Dickering and "haggling" refer to the same process.

== Where it takes place ==
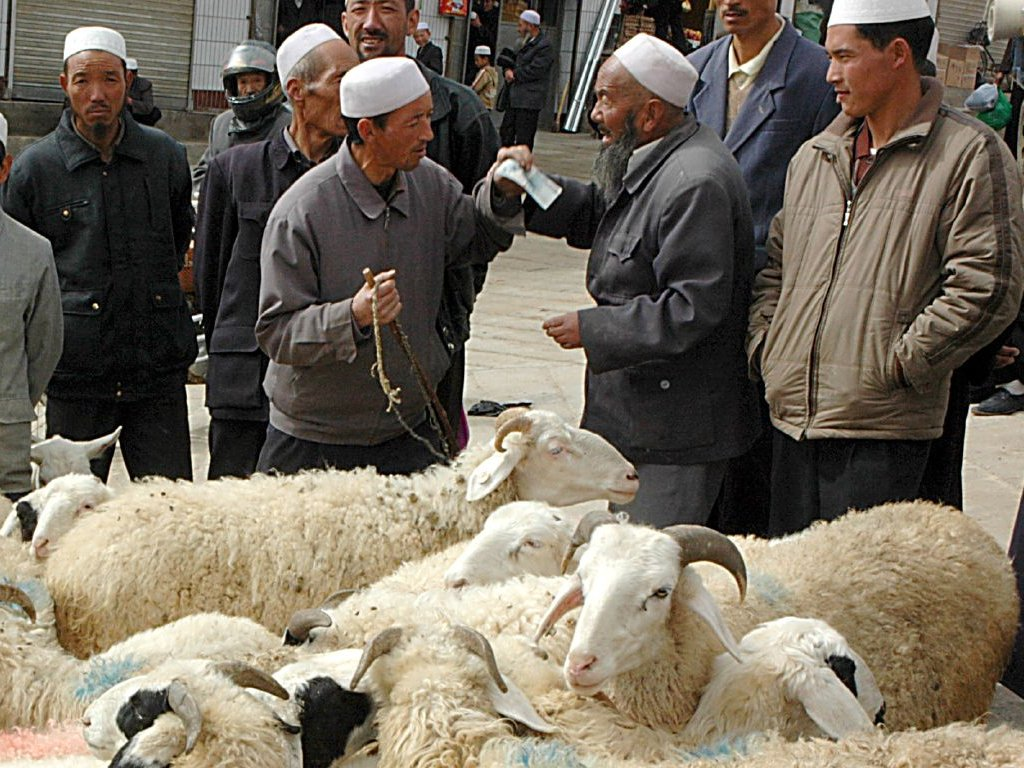
Dongxiangs bargaining for sheep in China's Gansu province.

Haggling is associated commonly with bazaars and other markets where centralized regulation is difficult or impossible. Both religious beliefs and regional custom may determine whether or not the sellers or buyers are willing to bargain.

=== Regional differences ===
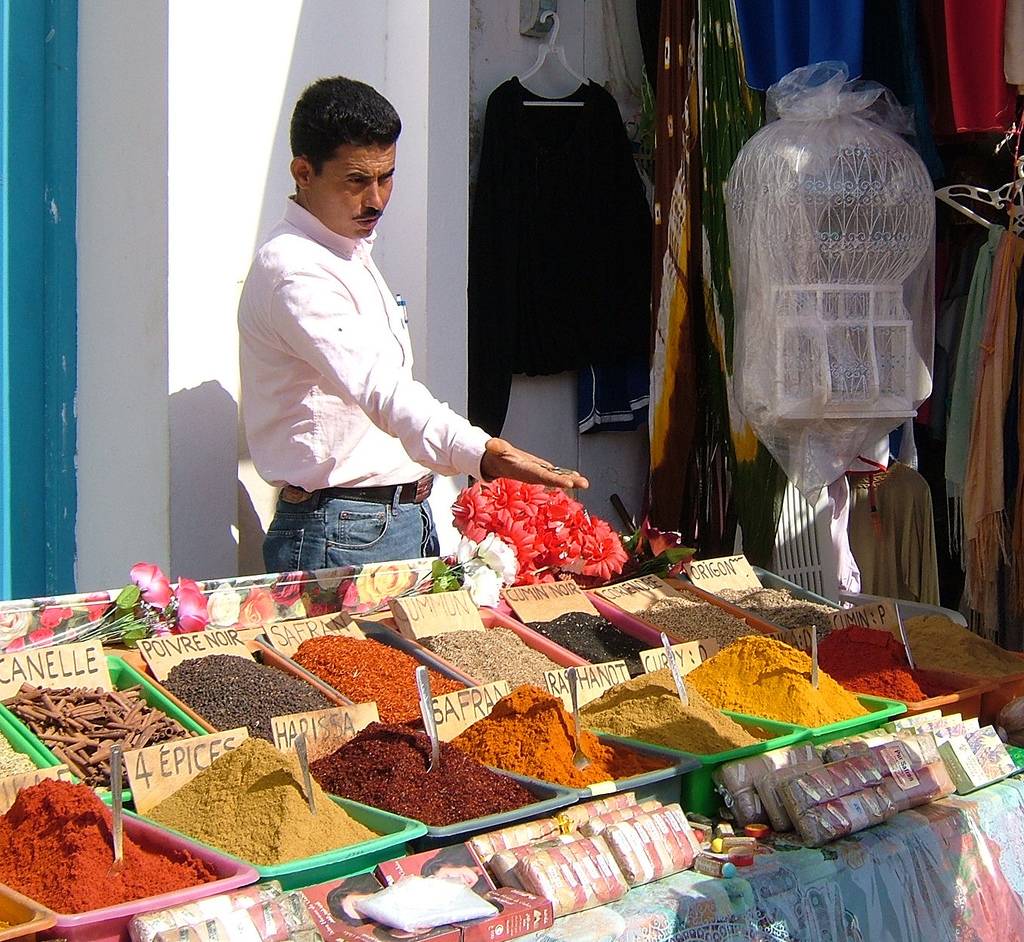
Spice market Djerba, Tunisia.

In North America, Australia, and Europe, bargaining is typically confined to transactions involving expensive or one-of-a-kind items (automobiles, antiques, jewelry, art, real estate, trade sales of businesses) and informal sales settings such as flea markets and garage sales. In other regions of the world, bargaining may be the norm, even for small commercial transactions.

In many parts of Asia, locals haggle for goods and services everywhere from street markets to hotels. Even children learn to haggle from a young age. Participating in that tradition can make foreigners feel accepted. On the other hand, in Thailand, haggling seems to be softer than the other countries due to Thai culture, in which people tend to be humble and avoiding of arguments. However, haggling for food items is strongly discouraged in Southeast Asia and is considered an insult, because food is seen as a common necessity that is not to be treated as a tradable good.

In almost all large complex business negotiations, a certain amount of bargaining takes place. One simplified 'western' way to decide when it's time to bargain is to break negotiation into two stages: creating value and claiming value. Claiming value is another phrase for bargaining. Many cultures take offense when they perceive the other side as having started bargaining too soon. This offense is usually as a result of their wanting to first create value for longer before they bargain together. The Chinese culture, by contrast, places a much higher value on taking time to build a business relationship before starting to create value or bargain. Not understanding when to start bargaining has ruined many an otherwise positive business negotiation.

In areas where bargaining at the retail level is common, the option to bargain often depends on the presence of the store's owner. A chain store managed by clerks is more likely to use fixed pricing than an independent store managed by an owner or one of the owner's trusted employees.

== Psychological Aspects of Bargaining ==
Bargaining is not just a rational negotiation process; psychological factors play a crucial role in its outcomes. Research suggests that emotions, cognitive biases, and perceived fairness significantly influence bargaining behavior. For example, studies have shown that individuals experiencing anger during negotiations tend to make more aggressive offers, while those feeling guilt or regret are more likely to make concessions (Thompson et al., 2010). Additionally, the endowment effect—a cognitive bias where people overvalue items they own—can impact bargaining outcomes by making sellers demand higher prices than buyers are willing to pay. These psychological influences highlight the complexity of bargaining beyond economic models.

Thompson, L., Wang, J., & Gunia, B. C. (2010). "Negotiation." Annual Review of Psychology, 61, 491-515.

== Theories ==
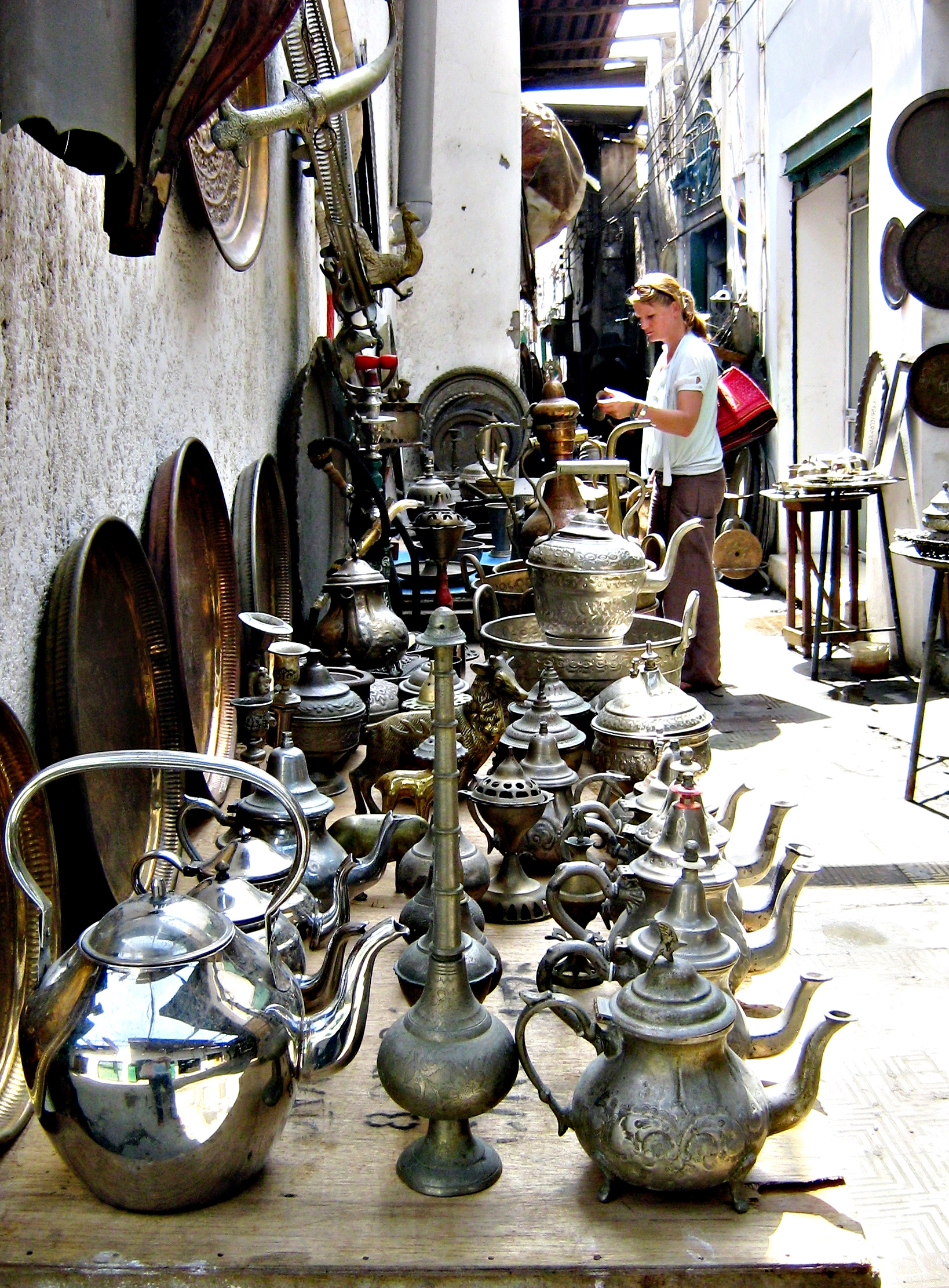
Medina Tripoli, Libya

=== Behavioral theory ===
The personality theory in bargaining emphasizes that the type of personalities determine the bargaining process and its outcome. A popular behavioral theory deals with a distinction between hard-liners and soft-liners. Various research papers refer to hard-liners as warriors, while soft-liners are shopkeepers. It varies from region to region. Bargaining may take place more in rural and semi-urban areas than in a metro city.

=== Game theory ===
Bargaining games refer to situations where two or more players must reach an agreement regarding how to distribute an object or monetary amount. Each player prefers to reach an agreement in these games, rather than abstain from doing so. However, each prefers that the agreement favor their interests. Examples of such situations include the bargaining involved in a labor union and the directors of a company negotiating wage increases, the dispute between two communities about the distribution of a common territory, or the conditions under which two countries agree on nuclear disarmament. Analyzing these kinds of problems looks for a solution that specifies which component in dispute corresponds to each party involved.

Players in a bargaining problem can bargain for the objective as a whole at a precise moment in time. The problem can also be divided so that parts of the whole objective become subject to bargaining during different stages.

In a classical bargaining problem, the result is an agreement reached between all interested parties or the status quo of the problem. It is clear that studying how individual parties make their decisions is insufficient for predicting what agreement will be reached. However, classical bargaining theory assumes that each participant in a bargaining process will choose between possible agreements, following the conduct predicted by the rational choice model. It is particularly assumed that each player's preferences regarding the possible agreements can be represented by a von Neumann–Morgenstern utility theorem function.

Nash [1950] defines a classical bargaining problem as being a set of joint allocations of utility, some of which correspond to what the players would obtain if they reach an agreement, and another that represents what they would get if they failed to do so.

A bargaining game for two players is defined as a pair (F,d) where F is the set of possible joint utility allocations (possible agreements), and d is the disagreement point.

For the definition of a specific bargaining solution, it is usual to follow Nash's proposal, setting out the axioms this solution should satisfy. Some of the most frequent axioms used in the building of bargaining solutions are efficiency, symmetry, independence of irrelevant alternatives, scalar invariance, monotonicity, etc.

The Nash bargaining solution is the bargaining solution that maximizes the product of an agent's utilities on the bargaining set.

The Nash bargaining solution, however, only deals with the simplest structure of bargaining. It is not dynamic (failing to deal with how Pareto outcomes are achieved). Instead, for situations where the structure of the bargaining game is important, a more mainstream game-theoretic approach is useful. This can allow players' preferences over time and risk to be incorporated into the solution of bargaining games. It can also show how the details can matter. For example, the Nash bargaining solution for the prisoners' dilemma is different from the Nash equilibrium.

=== Bargaining and posted prices in retail markets ===
Retailers can choose to sell at posted prices or allow bargaining: selling at a public posted price commits the retailer not to exploit buyers once they enter the retail store, making the store more attractive to potential customers, while a bargaining strategy has the advantage that it allows the retailer to price discriminate between different types of customer. In some markets, such as those for automobiles and expensive electronic goods, firms post prices but are open to haggling with consumers. When the proportion of haggling consumers goes up, prices tend to rise.

=== Processual theory ===
This theory isolates distinctive elements of the bargaining chronology in order to better understand the complexity of the negotiating process. Several key features of the processual theory include:

- Bargaining range
- Critical risk
- Security point

=== Integrative theory ===
Integrative bargaining (also called "interest-based bargaining," "win-win bargaining") is a negotiation strategy in which parties collaborate to find a "win-win" solution to their dispute. This strategy focuses on developing mutually beneficial agreements based on the interests of the disputants. Interests include the needs, desires, concerns, and fears important to each side. They are the underlying reasons why people become involved in a conflict.

"Integrative refers to the potential for the parties' interests to be [combined] in ways that create joint value or enlarge the pie." Potential for integration only exists when there are multiple issues involved in the negotiation. This is because the parties must be able to make trade-offs across issues in order for both sides to be satisfied with the outcome.

=== Automated bargaining ===
When a bargaining situation is complex, finding Nash equilibrium is difficult using game theory. Evolutionary computation methods have been designed for automated bargaining, and demonstrated efficient and effective for approximating Nash equilibrium.

== See also ==
- Alternating offers protocol
- Bargain Hunt - TV show involving bargaining for antiques
- Discounts and allowances
- Dynamic pricing
- Fixed price
- Group buy
- Golden Balls - a TV game where bargaining takes place.
- Intra-household bargaining
- Price tag
- Retailing
- Rubinstein bargaining model
